

246001–246100 

|-bgcolor=#d6d6d6
| 246001 ||  || — || September 29, 2006 || Kitt Peak || Spacewatch || HYG || align=right | 3.6 km || 
|-id=002 bgcolor=#d6d6d6
| 246002 ||  || — || September 30, 2006 || Mount Lemmon || Mount Lemmon Survey || — || align=right | 3.6 km || 
|-id=003 bgcolor=#E9E9E9
| 246003 ||  || — || September 25, 2006 || Catalina || CSS || — || align=right | 3.2 km || 
|-id=004 bgcolor=#d6d6d6
| 246004 ||  || — || October 10, 2006 || Palomar || NEAT || CRO || align=right | 4.4 km || 
|-id=005 bgcolor=#E9E9E9
| 246005 ||  || — || October 10, 2006 || Palomar || NEAT || — || align=right | 1.5 km || 
|-id=006 bgcolor=#E9E9E9
| 246006 ||  || — || October 10, 2006 || Palomar || NEAT || AGN || align=right | 1.8 km || 
|-id=007 bgcolor=#E9E9E9
| 246007 ||  || — || October 11, 2006 || Kitt Peak || Spacewatch || — || align=right | 3.4 km || 
|-id=008 bgcolor=#d6d6d6
| 246008 ||  || — || October 11, 2006 || Kitt Peak || Spacewatch || — || align=right | 5.4 km || 
|-id=009 bgcolor=#d6d6d6
| 246009 ||  || — || October 11, 2006 || Kitt Peak || Spacewatch || — || align=right | 4.3 km || 
|-id=010 bgcolor=#d6d6d6
| 246010 ||  || — || October 11, 2006 || Kitt Peak || Spacewatch || HYG || align=right | 3.3 km || 
|-id=011 bgcolor=#E9E9E9
| 246011 ||  || — || October 12, 2006 || Kitt Peak || Spacewatch || — || align=right | 2.3 km || 
|-id=012 bgcolor=#d6d6d6
| 246012 ||  || — || October 10, 2006 || Palomar || NEAT || — || align=right | 4.2 km || 
|-id=013 bgcolor=#d6d6d6
| 246013 ||  || — || October 11, 2006 || Palomar || NEAT || — || align=right | 3.7 km || 
|-id=014 bgcolor=#E9E9E9
| 246014 ||  || — || October 11, 2006 || Palomar || NEAT || AGN || align=right | 1.5 km || 
|-id=015 bgcolor=#d6d6d6
| 246015 ||  || — || October 11, 2006 || Palomar || NEAT || — || align=right | 3.9 km || 
|-id=016 bgcolor=#d6d6d6
| 246016 ||  || — || October 11, 2006 || Kitt Peak || Spacewatch || THM || align=right | 3.0 km || 
|-id=017 bgcolor=#d6d6d6
| 246017 ||  || — || October 12, 2006 || Palomar || NEAT || — || align=right | 4.9 km || 
|-id=018 bgcolor=#d6d6d6
| 246018 ||  || — || October 12, 2006 || Kitt Peak || Spacewatch || 7:4 || align=right | 4.2 km || 
|-id=019 bgcolor=#d6d6d6
| 246019 ||  || — || October 15, 2006 || Kitt Peak || Spacewatch || 7:4 || align=right | 6.8 km || 
|-id=020 bgcolor=#d6d6d6
| 246020 ||  || — || October 11, 2006 || Palomar || NEAT || — || align=right | 4.0 km || 
|-id=021 bgcolor=#d6d6d6
| 246021 ||  || — || October 3, 2006 || Apache Point || A. C. Becker || EOS || align=right | 2.9 km || 
|-id=022 bgcolor=#d6d6d6
| 246022 ||  || — || October 16, 2006 || Goodricke-Pigott || R. A. Tucker || — || align=right | 4.1 km || 
|-id=023 bgcolor=#d6d6d6
| 246023 ||  || — || October 17, 2006 || Mount Lemmon || Mount Lemmon Survey || — || align=right | 3.8 km || 
|-id=024 bgcolor=#E9E9E9
| 246024 ||  || — || October 16, 2006 || Kitt Peak || Spacewatch || — || align=right | 1.9 km || 
|-id=025 bgcolor=#d6d6d6
| 246025 ||  || — || October 17, 2006 || Catalina || CSS || HYG || align=right | 4.9 km || 
|-id=026 bgcolor=#d6d6d6
| 246026 ||  || — || October 17, 2006 || Catalina || CSS || — || align=right | 3.2 km || 
|-id=027 bgcolor=#d6d6d6
| 246027 ||  || — || October 18, 2006 || Kitt Peak || Spacewatch || — || align=right | 3.9 km || 
|-id=028 bgcolor=#E9E9E9
| 246028 ||  || — || October 16, 2006 || Catalina || CSS || — || align=right | 1.5 km || 
|-id=029 bgcolor=#E9E9E9
| 246029 ||  || — || October 16, 2006 || Catalina || CSS || — || align=right | 2.9 km || 
|-id=030 bgcolor=#E9E9E9
| 246030 ||  || — || October 17, 2006 || Catalina || CSS || — || align=right | 1.4 km || 
|-id=031 bgcolor=#d6d6d6
| 246031 ||  || — || October 17, 2006 || Kitt Peak || Spacewatch || — || align=right | 3.5 km || 
|-id=032 bgcolor=#E9E9E9
| 246032 ||  || — || October 17, 2006 || Kitt Peak || Spacewatch || — || align=right | 3.1 km || 
|-id=033 bgcolor=#E9E9E9
| 246033 ||  || — || October 17, 2006 || Kitt Peak || Spacewatch || — || align=right | 2.5 km || 
|-id=034 bgcolor=#d6d6d6
| 246034 ||  || — || October 18, 2006 || Kitt Peak || Spacewatch || EOS || align=right | 2.1 km || 
|-id=035 bgcolor=#d6d6d6
| 246035 ||  || — || October 19, 2006 || Kitt Peak || Spacewatch || THM || align=right | 2.9 km || 
|-id=036 bgcolor=#E9E9E9
| 246036 ||  || — || October 19, 2006 || Catalina || CSS || EUN || align=right | 2.4 km || 
|-id=037 bgcolor=#d6d6d6
| 246037 ||  || — || October 20, 2006 || Catalina || CSS || — || align=right | 5.5 km || 
|-id=038 bgcolor=#d6d6d6
| 246038 ||  || — || October 20, 2006 || Catalina || CSS || — || align=right | 6.3 km || 
|-id=039 bgcolor=#d6d6d6
| 246039 ||  || — || October 16, 2006 || Catalina || CSS || BRA || align=right | 3.3 km || 
|-id=040 bgcolor=#d6d6d6
| 246040 ||  || — || October 16, 2006 || Catalina || CSS || — || align=right | 4.3 km || 
|-id=041 bgcolor=#E9E9E9
| 246041 ||  || — || October 19, 2006 || Catalina || CSS || — || align=right | 2.3 km || 
|-id=042 bgcolor=#d6d6d6
| 246042 ||  || — || October 19, 2006 || Catalina || CSS || EUP || align=right | 4.5 km || 
|-id=043 bgcolor=#d6d6d6
| 246043 ||  || — || October 19, 2006 || Catalina || CSS || — || align=right | 4.1 km || 
|-id=044 bgcolor=#d6d6d6
| 246044 ||  || — || October 20, 2006 || Mount Lemmon || Mount Lemmon Survey || VER || align=right | 4.8 km || 
|-id=045 bgcolor=#E9E9E9
| 246045 ||  || — || October 20, 2006 || Mount Lemmon || Mount Lemmon Survey || — || align=right | 3.7 km || 
|-id=046 bgcolor=#E9E9E9
| 246046 ||  || — || October 23, 2006 || Kitt Peak || Spacewatch || — || align=right | 3.6 km || 
|-id=047 bgcolor=#d6d6d6
| 246047 ||  || — || October 17, 2006 || Kitt Peak || Spacewatch || URS || align=right | 6.5 km || 
|-id=048 bgcolor=#d6d6d6
| 246048 ||  || — || October 21, 2006 || Palomar || NEAT || — || align=right | 3.6 km || 
|-id=049 bgcolor=#d6d6d6
| 246049 ||  || — || October 21, 2006 || Palomar || NEAT || HYG || align=right | 4.1 km || 
|-id=050 bgcolor=#d6d6d6
| 246050 ||  || — || October 23, 2006 || Kitt Peak || Spacewatch || THM || align=right | 3.3 km || 
|-id=051 bgcolor=#E9E9E9
| 246051 ||  || — || October 23, 2006 || Kitt Peak || Spacewatch || — || align=right | 3.2 km || 
|-id=052 bgcolor=#d6d6d6
| 246052 ||  || — || October 27, 2006 || Mount Lemmon || Mount Lemmon Survey || SYL7:4 || align=right | 6.9 km || 
|-id=053 bgcolor=#d6d6d6
| 246053 ||  || — || October 22, 2006 || Mount Lemmon || Mount Lemmon Survey || EOS || align=right | 3.1 km || 
|-id=054 bgcolor=#d6d6d6
| 246054 ||  || — || October 28, 2006 || Kitt Peak || Spacewatch || — || align=right | 4.5 km || 
|-id=055 bgcolor=#d6d6d6
| 246055 ||  || — || November 10, 2006 || Kitt Peak || Spacewatch || — || align=right | 4.1 km || 
|-id=056 bgcolor=#d6d6d6
| 246056 ||  || — || November 11, 2006 || Catalina || CSS || — || align=right | 3.5 km || 
|-id=057 bgcolor=#E9E9E9
| 246057 ||  || — || November 10, 2006 || Kitt Peak || Spacewatch || — || align=right | 2.4 km || 
|-id=058 bgcolor=#E9E9E9
| 246058 ||  || — || November 11, 2006 || Kitt Peak || Spacewatch || RAF || align=right | 2.3 km || 
|-id=059 bgcolor=#E9E9E9
| 246059 ||  || — || November 10, 2006 || Socorro || LINEAR || — || align=right | 1.8 km || 
|-id=060 bgcolor=#E9E9E9
| 246060 ||  || — || November 11, 2006 || Kitt Peak || Spacewatch || AEO || align=right | 1.3 km || 
|-id=061 bgcolor=#d6d6d6
| 246061 ||  || — || November 11, 2006 || Kitt Peak || Spacewatch || — || align=right | 3.2 km || 
|-id=062 bgcolor=#E9E9E9
| 246062 ||  || — || November 11, 2006 || Kitt Peak || Spacewatch || DOR || align=right | 3.9 km || 
|-id=063 bgcolor=#E9E9E9
| 246063 ||  || — || November 11, 2006 || Mount Lemmon || Mount Lemmon Survey || — || align=right | 3.4 km || 
|-id=064 bgcolor=#d6d6d6
| 246064 ||  || — || November 15, 2006 || Catalina || CSS || — || align=right | 4.0 km || 
|-id=065 bgcolor=#d6d6d6
| 246065 ||  || — || November 11, 2006 || Mount Lemmon || Mount Lemmon Survey || — || align=right | 4.0 km || 
|-id=066 bgcolor=#E9E9E9
| 246066 ||  || — || November 14, 2006 || Mount Lemmon || Mount Lemmon Survey || — || align=right | 2.5 km || 
|-id=067 bgcolor=#d6d6d6
| 246067 ||  || — || November 15, 2006 || Socorro || LINEAR || — || align=right | 5.0 km || 
|-id=068 bgcolor=#E9E9E9
| 246068 ||  || — || November 2, 2006 || Catalina || CSS || — || align=right | 2.6 km || 
|-id=069 bgcolor=#d6d6d6
| 246069 ||  || — || November 14, 2006 || Kitt Peak || Spacewatch || — || align=right | 4.3 km || 
|-id=070 bgcolor=#E9E9E9
| 246070 ||  || — || November 16, 2006 || Mount Lemmon || Mount Lemmon Survey || — || align=right | 3.3 km || 
|-id=071 bgcolor=#d6d6d6
| 246071 ||  || — || November 16, 2006 || Kitt Peak || Spacewatch || — || align=right | 4.3 km || 
|-id=072 bgcolor=#d6d6d6
| 246072 ||  || — || November 17, 2006 || Kitt Peak || Spacewatch || HYG || align=right | 4.0 km || 
|-id=073 bgcolor=#d6d6d6
| 246073 ||  || — || November 17, 2006 || Catalina || CSS || MEL || align=right | 5.2 km || 
|-id=074 bgcolor=#E9E9E9
| 246074 ||  || — || November 19, 2006 || Catalina || CSS || PAD || align=right | 3.7 km || 
|-id=075 bgcolor=#E9E9E9
| 246075 ||  || — || November 21, 2006 || Socorro || LINEAR || — || align=right | 4.0 km || 
|-id=076 bgcolor=#E9E9E9
| 246076 ||  || — || November 20, 2006 || Kitt Peak || Spacewatch || HOF || align=right | 3.0 km || 
|-id=077 bgcolor=#fefefe
| 246077 ||  || — || November 16, 2006 || Kitt Peak || Spacewatch || — || align=right | 1.1 km || 
|-id=078 bgcolor=#E9E9E9
| 246078 ||  || — || November 20, 2006 || Catalina || CSS || MAR || align=right | 3.0 km || 
|-id=079 bgcolor=#E9E9E9
| 246079 ||  || — || December 14, 2006 || Kitami || K. Endate || ADE || align=right | 4.5 km || 
|-id=080 bgcolor=#E9E9E9
| 246080 ||  || — || December 1, 2006 || Catalina || CSS || — || align=right | 1.7 km || 
|-id=081 bgcolor=#E9E9E9
| 246081 ||  || — || December 6, 2006 || Palomar || NEAT || EUN || align=right | 2.0 km || 
|-id=082 bgcolor=#d6d6d6
| 246082 ||  || — || December 10, 2006 || Kitt Peak || Spacewatch || EOS || align=right | 3.4 km || 
|-id=083 bgcolor=#E9E9E9
| 246083 ||  || — || December 10, 2006 || Kitt Peak || Spacewatch || — || align=right | 1.8 km || 
|-id=084 bgcolor=#E9E9E9
| 246084 ||  || — || December 11, 2006 || Kitt Peak || Spacewatch || HOF || align=right | 3.1 km || 
|-id=085 bgcolor=#E9E9E9
| 246085 ||  || — || December 14, 2006 || Kitt Peak || Spacewatch || — || align=right | 3.8 km || 
|-id=086 bgcolor=#d6d6d6
| 246086 ||  || — || December 21, 2006 || Kitt Peak || Spacewatch || — || align=right | 5.4 km || 
|-id=087 bgcolor=#d6d6d6
| 246087 ||  || — || January 8, 2007 || Kitt Peak || Spacewatch || — || align=right | 5.3 km || 
|-id=088 bgcolor=#d6d6d6
| 246088 ||  || — || January 9, 2007 || Marly || P. Kocher || — || align=right | 4.3 km || 
|-id=089 bgcolor=#d6d6d6
| 246089 ||  || — || January 14, 2007 || Črni Vrh || Črni Vrh || EUP || align=right | 7.3 km || 
|-id=090 bgcolor=#d6d6d6
| 246090 ||  || — || January 15, 2007 || Goodricke-Pigott || R. A. Tucker || — || align=right | 6.2 km || 
|-id=091 bgcolor=#d6d6d6
| 246091 ||  || — || January 15, 2007 || Anderson Mesa || LONEOS || — || align=right | 4.2 km || 
|-id=092 bgcolor=#d6d6d6
| 246092 ||  || — || January 16, 2007 || Catalina || CSS || ALA || align=right | 6.6 km || 
|-id=093 bgcolor=#d6d6d6
| 246093 ||  || — || January 24, 2007 || Mount Lemmon || Mount Lemmon Survey || — || align=right | 4.6 km || 
|-id=094 bgcolor=#d6d6d6
| 246094 ||  || — || February 8, 2007 || Palomar || NEAT || — || align=right | 2.9 km || 
|-id=095 bgcolor=#fefefe
| 246095 ||  || — || February 16, 2007 || Mount Lemmon || Mount Lemmon Survey || H || align=right data-sort-value="0.99" | 990 m || 
|-id=096 bgcolor=#E9E9E9
| 246096 ||  || — || March 10, 2007 || Mount Lemmon || Mount Lemmon Survey || — || align=right | 3.7 km || 
|-id=097 bgcolor=#fefefe
| 246097 ||  || — || March 10, 2007 || Kitt Peak || Spacewatch || — || align=right | 2.5 km || 
|-id=098 bgcolor=#E9E9E9
| 246098 ||  || — || March 11, 2007 || Mount Lemmon || Mount Lemmon Survey || — || align=right | 4.5 km || 
|-id=099 bgcolor=#fefefe
| 246099 ||  || — || March 10, 2007 || Mount Lemmon || Mount Lemmon Survey || — || align=right data-sort-value="0.73" | 730 m || 
|-id=100 bgcolor=#fefefe
| 246100 ||  || — || March 10, 2007 || Palomar || NEAT || H || align=right data-sort-value="0.94" | 940 m || 
|}

246101–246200 

|-bgcolor=#fefefe
| 246101 ||  || — || March 12, 2007 || Mount Lemmon || Mount Lemmon Survey || FLO || align=right data-sort-value="0.62" | 620 m || 
|-id=102 bgcolor=#fefefe
| 246102 ||  || — || March 12, 2007 || Kitt Peak || Spacewatch || FLO || align=right data-sort-value="0.69" | 690 m || 
|-id=103 bgcolor=#E9E9E9
| 246103 ||  || — || March 14, 2007 || Mount Lemmon || Mount Lemmon Survey || — || align=right | 3.9 km || 
|-id=104 bgcolor=#d6d6d6
| 246104 ||  || — || March 15, 2007 || Mount Lemmon || Mount Lemmon Survey || — || align=right | 5.2 km || 
|-id=105 bgcolor=#fefefe
| 246105 ||  || — || March 14, 2007 || Kitt Peak || Spacewatch || — || align=right data-sort-value="0.62" | 620 m || 
|-id=106 bgcolor=#fefefe
| 246106 ||  || — || March 11, 2007 || Mount Lemmon || Mount Lemmon Survey || H || align=right data-sort-value="0.75" | 750 m || 
|-id=107 bgcolor=#fefefe
| 246107 ||  || — || March 20, 2007 || Anderson Mesa || LONEOS || H || align=right data-sort-value="0.80" | 800 m || 
|-id=108 bgcolor=#C2FFFF
| 246108 ||  || — || March 20, 2007 || Mount Lemmon || Mount Lemmon Survey || L5 || align=right | 12 km || 
|-id=109 bgcolor=#fefefe
| 246109 ||  || — || March 20, 2007 || Mount Lemmon || Mount Lemmon Survey || — || align=right data-sort-value="0.85" | 850 m || 
|-id=110 bgcolor=#E9E9E9
| 246110 ||  || — || March 26, 2007 || Mount Lemmon || Mount Lemmon Survey || — || align=right | 2.8 km || 
|-id=111 bgcolor=#E9E9E9
| 246111 ||  || — || March 20, 2007 || Catalina || CSS || MIT || align=right | 3.7 km || 
|-id=112 bgcolor=#E9E9E9
| 246112 ||  || — || April 15, 2007 || Kitt Peak || Spacewatch || — || align=right | 3.2 km || 
|-id=113 bgcolor=#C2FFFF
| 246113 ||  || — || April 15, 2007 || Mount Lemmon || Mount Lemmon Survey || L5 || align=right | 10 km || 
|-id=114 bgcolor=#C2FFFF
| 246114 ||  || — || April 15, 2007 || Mount Lemmon || Mount Lemmon Survey || L5 || align=right | 12 km || 
|-id=115 bgcolor=#fefefe
| 246115 ||  || — || April 16, 2007 || Socorro || LINEAR || — || align=right | 1.0 km || 
|-id=116 bgcolor=#E9E9E9
| 246116 ||  || — || April 18, 2007 || Mount Lemmon || Mount Lemmon Survey || — || align=right | 4.0 km || 
|-id=117 bgcolor=#fefefe
| 246117 ||  || — || April 20, 2007 || Kitt Peak || Spacewatch || — || align=right | 1.1 km || 
|-id=118 bgcolor=#E9E9E9
| 246118 ||  || — || April 20, 2007 || Tiki || N. Teamo || — || align=right | 3.4 km || 
|-id=119 bgcolor=#fefefe
| 246119 ||  || — || May 7, 2007 || Kitt Peak || Spacewatch || — || align=right data-sort-value="0.90" | 900 m || 
|-id=120 bgcolor=#d6d6d6
| 246120 ||  || — || May 6, 2007 || Kitt Peak || Spacewatch || URS || align=right | 6.3 km || 
|-id=121 bgcolor=#E9E9E9
| 246121 ||  || — || May 7, 2007 || Kitt Peak || Spacewatch || — || align=right | 1.4 km || 
|-id=122 bgcolor=#d6d6d6
| 246122 ||  || — || May 7, 2007 || Kitt Peak || Spacewatch || EOS || align=right | 4.0 km || 
|-id=123 bgcolor=#fefefe
| 246123 ||  || — || May 7, 2007 || Lulin Observatory || LUSS || — || align=right data-sort-value="0.89" | 890 m || 
|-id=124 bgcolor=#fefefe
| 246124 ||  || — || May 11, 2007 || Lulin Observatory || LUSS || NYS || align=right data-sort-value="0.76" | 760 m || 
|-id=125 bgcolor=#fefefe
| 246125 ||  || — || May 11, 2007 || Catalina || CSS || H || align=right data-sort-value="0.94" | 940 m || 
|-id=126 bgcolor=#fefefe
| 246126 ||  || — || May 21, 2007 || Catalina || CSS || — || align=right | 1.2 km || 
|-id=127 bgcolor=#d6d6d6
| 246127 ||  || — || June 10, 2007 || Kitt Peak || Spacewatch || — || align=right | 4.9 km || 
|-id=128 bgcolor=#d6d6d6
| 246128 ||  || — || June 9, 2007 || Catalina || CSS || — || align=right | 6.9 km || 
|-id=129 bgcolor=#d6d6d6
| 246129 ||  || — || June 14, 2007 || Kitt Peak || Spacewatch || — || align=right | 4.8 km || 
|-id=130 bgcolor=#fefefe
| 246130 ||  || — || June 15, 2007 || Kitt Peak || Spacewatch || — || align=right | 1.1 km || 
|-id=131 bgcolor=#d6d6d6
| 246131 ||  || — || June 12, 2007 || Catalina || CSS || EUP || align=right | 6.8 km || 
|-id=132 bgcolor=#fefefe
| 246132 Lugyny ||  ||  || July 9, 2007 || Andrushivka || Andrushivka Obs. || — || align=right | 1.2 km || 
|-id=133 bgcolor=#E9E9E9
| 246133 ||  || — || July 12, 2007 || La Sagra || OAM Obs. || — || align=right | 3.9 km || 
|-id=134 bgcolor=#fefefe
| 246134 ||  || — || July 13, 2007 || Tiki || N. Teamo || — || align=right data-sort-value="0.91" | 910 m || 
|-id=135 bgcolor=#E9E9E9
| 246135 ||  || — || July 10, 2007 || Siding Spring || SSS || MAR || align=right | 1.8 km || 
|-id=136 bgcolor=#E9E9E9
| 246136 ||  || — || July 10, 2007 || Siding Spring || SSS || MAR || align=right | 1.5 km || 
|-id=137 bgcolor=#fefefe
| 246137 || 2007 OC || — || July 16, 2007 || La Sagra || OAM Obs. || FLO || align=right data-sort-value="0.67" | 670 m || 
|-id=138 bgcolor=#FFC2E0
| 246138 ||  || — || July 19, 2007 || Catalina || CSS || AMO +1km || align=right data-sort-value="0.59" | 590 m || 
|-id=139 bgcolor=#fefefe
| 246139 ||  || — || July 25, 2007 || Lulin Observatory || LUSS || — || align=right | 1.1 km || 
|-id=140 bgcolor=#fefefe
| 246140 || 2007 PM || — || August 5, 2007 || Dauban || Chante-Perdrix Obs. || CIM || align=right | 4.3 km || 
|-id=141 bgcolor=#d6d6d6
| 246141 || 2007 PV || — || August 4, 2007 || Reedy Creek || J. Broughton || — || align=right | 4.8 km || 
|-id=142 bgcolor=#E9E9E9
| 246142 ||  || — || August 4, 2007 || Siding Spring || SSS || — || align=right | 2.4 km || 
|-id=143 bgcolor=#fefefe
| 246143 ||  || — || August 5, 2007 || Socorro || LINEAR || NYS || align=right | 2.2 km || 
|-id=144 bgcolor=#fefefe
| 246144 ||  || — || August 8, 2007 || Socorro || LINEAR || — || align=right data-sort-value="0.86" | 860 m || 
|-id=145 bgcolor=#C2FFFF
| 246145 ||  || — || August 11, 2007 || Dauban || Chante-Perdrix Obs. || L4ERY || align=right | 12 km || 
|-id=146 bgcolor=#fefefe
| 246146 ||  || — || August 9, 2007 || Socorro || LINEAR || — || align=right | 2.5 km || 
|-id=147 bgcolor=#C2FFFF
| 246147 ||  || — || August 8, 2007 || Socorro || LINEAR || L4 || align=right | 13 km || 
|-id=148 bgcolor=#fefefe
| 246148 ||  || — || August 12, 2007 || Socorro || LINEAR || — || align=right | 1.1 km || 
|-id=149 bgcolor=#fefefe
| 246149 ||  || — || August 12, 2007 || Socorro || LINEAR || — || align=right | 1.2 km || 
|-id=150 bgcolor=#E9E9E9
| 246150 ||  || — || August 12, 2007 || Socorro || LINEAR || DOR || align=right | 4.0 km || 
|-id=151 bgcolor=#fefefe
| 246151 ||  || — || August 12, 2007 || Socorro || LINEAR || FLO || align=right data-sort-value="0.79" | 790 m || 
|-id=152 bgcolor=#fefefe
| 246152 ||  || — || August 8, 2007 || Socorro || LINEAR || FLO || align=right data-sort-value="0.73" | 730 m || 
|-id=153 bgcolor=#fefefe
| 246153 Waltermaria ||  ||  || August 15, 2007 || San Marcello || M. Mazzucato, F. Dolfi || NYS || align=right data-sort-value="0.96" | 960 m || 
|-id=154 bgcolor=#fefefe
| 246154 ||  || — || August 5, 2007 || Socorro || LINEAR || FLO || align=right | 1.1 km || 
|-id=155 bgcolor=#fefefe
| 246155 ||  || — || August 12, 2007 || Socorro || LINEAR || — || align=right | 1.2 km || 
|-id=156 bgcolor=#fefefe
| 246156 ||  || — || August 9, 2007 || Socorro || LINEAR || FLO || align=right data-sort-value="0.80" | 800 m || 
|-id=157 bgcolor=#fefefe
| 246157 ||  || — || August 11, 2007 || Socorro || LINEAR || FLO || align=right data-sort-value="0.94" | 940 m || 
|-id=158 bgcolor=#fefefe
| 246158 ||  || — || August 13, 2007 || Socorro || LINEAR || — || align=right | 1.2 km || 
|-id=159 bgcolor=#fefefe
| 246159 ||  || — || August 15, 2007 || Socorro || LINEAR || FLO || align=right data-sort-value="0.80" | 800 m || 
|-id=160 bgcolor=#fefefe
| 246160 ||  || — || August 10, 2007 || Kitt Peak || Spacewatch || V || align=right data-sort-value="0.98" | 980 m || 
|-id=161 bgcolor=#E9E9E9
| 246161 ||  || — || August 13, 2007 || Siding Spring || SSS || — || align=right | 1.8 km || 
|-id=162 bgcolor=#FA8072
| 246162 || 2007 QR || — || August 16, 2007 || Purple Mountain || PMO NEO || — || align=right | 2.0 km || 
|-id=163 bgcolor=#fefefe
| 246163 ||  || — || August 19, 2007 || La Sagra || OAM Obs. || — || align=right | 1.4 km || 
|-id=164 bgcolor=#fefefe
| 246164 Zdvyzhensk ||  ||  || August 22, 2007 || Andrushivka || Andrushivka Obs. || V || align=right | 1.1 km || 
|-id=165 bgcolor=#fefefe
| 246165 ||  || — || August 23, 2007 || Kitt Peak || Spacewatch || — || align=right data-sort-value="0.80" | 800 m || 
|-id=166 bgcolor=#E9E9E9
| 246166 ||  || — || September 5, 2007 || La Sagra || OAM Obs. || EUN || align=right | 2.1 km || 
|-id=167 bgcolor=#E9E9E9
| 246167 Joskohn ||  ||  || September 5, 2007 || Marly || P. Kocher || ADE || align=right | 4.0 km || 
|-id=168 bgcolor=#fefefe
| 246168 ||  || — || September 3, 2007 || Catalina || CSS || — || align=right | 1.3 km || 
|-id=169 bgcolor=#fefefe
| 246169 ||  || — || September 11, 2007 || Goodricke-Pigott || R. A. Tucker || — || align=right | 1.1 km || 
|-id=170 bgcolor=#E9E9E9
| 246170 ||  || — || September 6, 2007 || La Sagra || OAM Obs. || DOR || align=right | 4.6 km || 
|-id=171 bgcolor=#fefefe
| 246171 Konrad ||  ||  || September 4, 2007 || Rimbach || M. König || — || align=right | 3.4 km || 
|-id=172 bgcolor=#fefefe
| 246172 ||  || — || September 13, 2007 || Mayhill || A. Lowe || — || align=right | 1.2 km || 
|-id=173 bgcolor=#fefefe
| 246173 ||  || — || September 12, 2007 || Bisei SG Center || BATTeRS || — || align=right | 1.3 km || 
|-id=174 bgcolor=#d6d6d6
| 246174 ||  || — || September 3, 2007 || Catalina || CSS || — || align=right | 4.8 km || 
|-id=175 bgcolor=#fefefe
| 246175 ||  || — || September 4, 2007 || Catalina || CSS || — || align=right | 1.8 km || 
|-id=176 bgcolor=#fefefe
| 246176 ||  || — || September 5, 2007 || Catalina || CSS || — || align=right | 3.8 km || 
|-id=177 bgcolor=#fefefe
| 246177 ||  || — || September 5, 2007 || Catalina || CSS || NYS || align=right data-sort-value="0.95" | 950 m || 
|-id=178 bgcolor=#d6d6d6
| 246178 ||  || — || September 8, 2007 || Anderson Mesa || LONEOS || HIL3:2 || align=right | 8.2 km || 
|-id=179 bgcolor=#fefefe
| 246179 ||  || — || September 8, 2007 || Anderson Mesa || LONEOS || MAS || align=right data-sort-value="0.97" | 970 m || 
|-id=180 bgcolor=#fefefe
| 246180 ||  || — || September 9, 2007 || Kitt Peak || Spacewatch || V || align=right data-sort-value="0.86" | 860 m || 
|-id=181 bgcolor=#fefefe
| 246181 ||  || — || September 9, 2007 || Mount Lemmon || Mount Lemmon Survey || — || align=right | 1.0 km || 
|-id=182 bgcolor=#fefefe
| 246182 ||  || — || September 9, 2007 || Mount Lemmon || Mount Lemmon Survey || FLO || align=right data-sort-value="0.79" | 790 m || 
|-id=183 bgcolor=#fefefe
| 246183 ||  || — || September 9, 2007 || Kitt Peak || Spacewatch || — || align=right | 1.5 km || 
|-id=184 bgcolor=#d6d6d6
| 246184 ||  || — || September 9, 2007 || Anderson Mesa || LONEOS || EUP || align=right | 5.0 km || 
|-id=185 bgcolor=#d6d6d6
| 246185 ||  || — || September 9, 2007 || Kitt Peak || Spacewatch || — || align=right | 5.4 km || 
|-id=186 bgcolor=#d6d6d6
| 246186 ||  || — || September 9, 2007 || Kitt Peak || Spacewatch || — || align=right | 3.7 km || 
|-id=187 bgcolor=#E9E9E9
| 246187 ||  || — || September 9, 2007 || Kitt Peak || Spacewatch || EUN || align=right | 2.1 km || 
|-id=188 bgcolor=#E9E9E9
| 246188 ||  || — || September 10, 2007 || Kitt Peak || Spacewatch || — || align=right | 3.8 km || 
|-id=189 bgcolor=#d6d6d6
| 246189 ||  || — || September 10, 2007 || Kitt Peak || Spacewatch || — || align=right | 2.5 km || 
|-id=190 bgcolor=#fefefe
| 246190 ||  || — || September 10, 2007 || Mount Lemmon || Mount Lemmon Survey || — || align=right data-sort-value="0.75" | 750 m || 
|-id=191 bgcolor=#d6d6d6
| 246191 ||  || — || September 10, 2007 || Kitt Peak || Spacewatch || — || align=right | 4.0 km || 
|-id=192 bgcolor=#d6d6d6
| 246192 ||  || — || September 10, 2007 || Mount Lemmon || Mount Lemmon Survey || — || align=right | 3.8 km || 
|-id=193 bgcolor=#E9E9E9
| 246193 ||  || — || September 11, 2007 || Kitt Peak || Spacewatch || — || align=right | 1.7 km || 
|-id=194 bgcolor=#fefefe
| 246194 ||  || — || September 11, 2007 || Catalina || CSS || — || align=right | 2.4 km || 
|-id=195 bgcolor=#fefefe
| 246195 ||  || — || September 11, 2007 || Catalina || CSS || — || align=right | 1.4 km || 
|-id=196 bgcolor=#fefefe
| 246196 ||  || — || September 11, 2007 || Kitt Peak || Spacewatch || — || align=right | 1.2 km || 
|-id=197 bgcolor=#d6d6d6
| 246197 ||  || — || September 11, 2007 || Kitt Peak || Spacewatch || — || align=right | 5.3 km || 
|-id=198 bgcolor=#E9E9E9
| 246198 ||  || — || September 12, 2007 || Mount Lemmon || Mount Lemmon Survey || — || align=right | 2.8 km || 
|-id=199 bgcolor=#fefefe
| 246199 ||  || — || September 12, 2007 || Mount Lemmon || Mount Lemmon Survey || NYS || align=right data-sort-value="0.81" | 810 m || 
|-id=200 bgcolor=#d6d6d6
| 246200 ||  || — || September 13, 2007 || Mount Lemmon || Mount Lemmon Survey || KOR || align=right | 1.7 km || 
|}

246201–246300 

|-bgcolor=#E9E9E9
| 246201 ||  || — || September 12, 2007 || Goodricke-Pigott || R. A. Tucker || — || align=right | 3.5 km || 
|-id=202 bgcolor=#fefefe
| 246202 ||  || — || September 14, 2007 || Mount Lemmon || Mount Lemmon Survey || — || align=right data-sort-value="0.75" | 750 m || 
|-id=203 bgcolor=#fefefe
| 246203 ||  || — || September 13, 2007 || Socorro || LINEAR || PHO || align=right | 4.4 km || 
|-id=204 bgcolor=#fefefe
| 246204 ||  || — || September 13, 2007 || Socorro || LINEAR || — || align=right | 1.2 km || 
|-id=205 bgcolor=#fefefe
| 246205 ||  || — || September 14, 2007 || Socorro || LINEAR || V || align=right | 1.0 km || 
|-id=206 bgcolor=#fefefe
| 246206 ||  || — || September 14, 2007 || Socorro || LINEAR || — || align=right data-sort-value="0.76" | 760 m || 
|-id=207 bgcolor=#E9E9E9
| 246207 ||  || — || September 14, 2007 || Socorro || LINEAR || — || align=right | 3.0 km || 
|-id=208 bgcolor=#E9E9E9
| 246208 ||  || — || September 14, 2007 || Socorro || LINEAR || WIT || align=right | 1.5 km || 
|-id=209 bgcolor=#d6d6d6
| 246209 ||  || — || September 12, 2007 || Lulin || LUSS || EOS || align=right | 3.1 km || 
|-id=210 bgcolor=#d6d6d6
| 246210 ||  || — || September 13, 2007 || Catalina || CSS || — || align=right | 4.9 km || 
|-id=211 bgcolor=#d6d6d6
| 246211 ||  || — || September 10, 2007 || Kitt Peak || Spacewatch || URS || align=right | 4.3 km || 
|-id=212 bgcolor=#d6d6d6
| 246212 ||  || — || September 10, 2007 || Kitt Peak || Spacewatch || CHA || align=right | 3.8 km || 
|-id=213 bgcolor=#E9E9E9
| 246213 ||  || — || September 10, 2007 || Kitt Peak || Spacewatch || PAD || align=right | 2.9 km || 
|-id=214 bgcolor=#d6d6d6
| 246214 ||  || — || September 10, 2007 || Kitt Peak || Spacewatch || — || align=right | 3.7 km || 
|-id=215 bgcolor=#E9E9E9
| 246215 ||  || — || September 10, 2007 || Kitt Peak || Spacewatch || HEN || align=right | 1.2 km || 
|-id=216 bgcolor=#fefefe
| 246216 ||  || — || September 10, 2007 || Kitt Peak || Spacewatch || NYS || align=right data-sort-value="0.87" | 870 m || 
|-id=217 bgcolor=#E9E9E9
| 246217 ||  || — || September 8, 2007 || Mount Lemmon || Mount Lemmon Survey || — || align=right | 3.0 km || 
|-id=218 bgcolor=#E9E9E9
| 246218 ||  || — || September 9, 2007 || Mount Lemmon || Mount Lemmon Survey || — || align=right | 3.3 km || 
|-id=219 bgcolor=#d6d6d6
| 246219 ||  || — || September 10, 2007 || Mount Lemmon || Mount Lemmon Survey || — || align=right | 3.9 km || 
|-id=220 bgcolor=#fefefe
| 246220 ||  || — || September 13, 2007 || Mount Lemmon || Mount Lemmon Survey || FLO || align=right data-sort-value="0.71" | 710 m || 
|-id=221 bgcolor=#fefefe
| 246221 ||  || — || September 12, 2007 || Kitt Peak || Spacewatch || MAS || align=right data-sort-value="0.82" | 820 m || 
|-id=222 bgcolor=#E9E9E9
| 246222 ||  || — || September 13, 2007 || Kitt Peak || Spacewatch || HEN || align=right | 1.3 km || 
|-id=223 bgcolor=#d6d6d6
| 246223 ||  || — || September 9, 2007 || Kitt Peak || Spacewatch || — || align=right | 5.8 km || 
|-id=224 bgcolor=#fefefe
| 246224 ||  || — || September 10, 2007 || Kitt Peak || Spacewatch || — || align=right | 1.1 km || 
|-id=225 bgcolor=#fefefe
| 246225 ||  || — || September 10, 2007 || Kitt Peak || Spacewatch || — || align=right data-sort-value="0.98" | 980 m || 
|-id=226 bgcolor=#fefefe
| 246226 ||  || — || September 11, 2007 || Kitt Peak || Spacewatch || CLA || align=right | 2.2 km || 
|-id=227 bgcolor=#fefefe
| 246227 ||  || — || September 13, 2007 || Mount Lemmon || Mount Lemmon Survey || ERI || align=right | 2.4 km || 
|-id=228 bgcolor=#fefefe
| 246228 ||  || — || September 11, 2007 || Purple Mountain || PMO NEO || — || align=right | 1.3 km || 
|-id=229 bgcolor=#E9E9E9
| 246229 ||  || — || September 11, 2007 || Purple Mountain || PMO NEO || HOF || align=right | 4.0 km || 
|-id=230 bgcolor=#fefefe
| 246230 ||  || — || September 14, 2007 || Catalina || CSS || V || align=right data-sort-value="0.96" | 960 m || 
|-id=231 bgcolor=#E9E9E9
| 246231 ||  || — || September 10, 2007 || Catalina || CSS || — || align=right | 3.6 km || 
|-id=232 bgcolor=#fefefe
| 246232 ||  || — || September 12, 2007 || Catalina || CSS || — || align=right | 1.0 km || 
|-id=233 bgcolor=#fefefe
| 246233 ||  || — || September 13, 2007 || Kitt Peak || Spacewatch || — || align=right | 1.0 km || 
|-id=234 bgcolor=#E9E9E9
| 246234 ||  || — || September 14, 2007 || Kitt Peak || Spacewatch || HNS || align=right | 1.6 km || 
|-id=235 bgcolor=#fefefe
| 246235 ||  || — || September 14, 2007 || Catalina || CSS || — || align=right | 1.4 km || 
|-id=236 bgcolor=#E9E9E9
| 246236 ||  || — || September 14, 2007 || Kitt Peak || Spacewatch || — || align=right | 2.8 km || 
|-id=237 bgcolor=#d6d6d6
| 246237 ||  || — || September 15, 2007 || Kitt Peak || Spacewatch || — || align=right | 3.9 km || 
|-id=238 bgcolor=#d6d6d6
| 246238 Crampton ||  ||  || September 5, 2007 || Mauna Kea || D. D. Balam || — || align=right | 5.7 km || 
|-id=239 bgcolor=#E9E9E9
| 246239 ||  || — || September 5, 2007 || Catalina || CSS || — || align=right | 3.3 km || 
|-id=240 bgcolor=#d6d6d6
| 246240 ||  || — || September 5, 2007 || Catalina || CSS || — || align=right | 3.4 km || 
|-id=241 bgcolor=#E9E9E9
| 246241 ||  || — || September 13, 2007 || Mount Lemmon || Mount Lemmon Survey || — || align=right | 2.7 km || 
|-id=242 bgcolor=#d6d6d6
| 246242 ||  || — || September 13, 2007 || Mount Lemmon || Mount Lemmon Survey || — || align=right | 3.9 km || 
|-id=243 bgcolor=#E9E9E9
| 246243 ||  || — || September 15, 2007 || Mount Lemmon || Mount Lemmon Survey || — || align=right | 3.7 km || 
|-id=244 bgcolor=#fefefe
| 246244 ||  || — || September 19, 2007 || Socorro || LINEAR || NYS || align=right data-sort-value="0.72" | 720 m || 
|-id=245 bgcolor=#fefefe
| 246245 ||  || — || September 21, 2007 || Socorro || LINEAR || NYS || align=right data-sort-value="0.96" | 960 m || 
|-id=246 bgcolor=#E9E9E9
| 246246 ||  || — || September 18, 2007 || Kitt Peak || Spacewatch || — || align=right | 1.1 km || 
|-id=247 bgcolor=#E9E9E9
| 246247 Sheldoncooper ||  ||  || September 20, 2007 || Lulin Observatory || Q.-z. Ye, H.-C. Lin || — || align=right | 3.7 km || 
|-id=248 bgcolor=#d6d6d6
| 246248 || 2007 TX || — || October 2, 2007 || Antares || ARO || EOS || align=right | 3.2 km || 
|-id=249 bgcolor=#d6d6d6
| 246249 ||  || — || October 5, 2007 || Bergisch Gladbach || W. Bickel || EOS || align=right | 2.5 km || 
|-id=250 bgcolor=#fefefe
| 246250 ||  || — || October 6, 2007 || 7300 Observatory || W. K. Y. Yeung || V || align=right data-sort-value="0.81" | 810 m || 
|-id=251 bgcolor=#d6d6d6
| 246251 ||  || — || October 6, 2007 || La Sagra || OAM Obs. || EUP || align=right | 6.9 km || 
|-id=252 bgcolor=#d6d6d6
| 246252 ||  || — || October 6, 2007 || La Sagra || OAM Obs. || — || align=right | 5.2 km || 
|-id=253 bgcolor=#fefefe
| 246253 ||  || — || October 7, 2007 || Dauban || Chante-Perdrix Obs. || — || align=right | 1.1 km || 
|-id=254 bgcolor=#d6d6d6
| 246254 ||  || — || October 7, 2007 || Altschwendt || W. Ries || — || align=right | 4.2 km || 
|-id=255 bgcolor=#fefefe
| 246255 ||  || — || October 6, 2007 || Socorro || LINEAR || — || align=right data-sort-value="0.91" | 910 m || 
|-id=256 bgcolor=#d6d6d6
| 246256 ||  || — || October 6, 2007 || Socorro || LINEAR || — || align=right | 4.3 km || 
|-id=257 bgcolor=#E9E9E9
| 246257 ||  || — || October 6, 2007 || Socorro || LINEAR || JUN || align=right | 1.7 km || 
|-id=258 bgcolor=#fefefe
| 246258 ||  || — || October 8, 2007 || Altschwendt || W. Ries || NYS || align=right data-sort-value="0.94" | 940 m || 
|-id=259 bgcolor=#E9E9E9
| 246259 ||  || — || October 8, 2007 || 7300 || W. K. Y. Yeung || — || align=right | 1.2 km || 
|-id=260 bgcolor=#E9E9E9
| 246260 ||  || — || October 6, 2007 || Kitt Peak || Spacewatch || JUN || align=right | 1.4 km || 
|-id=261 bgcolor=#E9E9E9
| 246261 ||  || — || October 6, 2007 || Kitt Peak || Spacewatch || — || align=right | 2.4 km || 
|-id=262 bgcolor=#fefefe
| 246262 ||  || — || October 7, 2007 || Calvin-Rehoboth || Calvin–Rehoboth Obs. || — || align=right data-sort-value="0.64" | 640 m || 
|-id=263 bgcolor=#fefefe
| 246263 ||  || — || October 7, 2007 || Dauban || Chante-Perdrix Obs. || FLO || align=right data-sort-value="0.85" | 850 m || 
|-id=264 bgcolor=#E9E9E9
| 246264 ||  || — || October 4, 2007 || Kitt Peak || Spacewatch || — || align=right | 1.5 km || 
|-id=265 bgcolor=#E9E9E9
| 246265 ||  || — || October 4, 2007 || Kitt Peak || Spacewatch || AER || align=right | 1.6 km || 
|-id=266 bgcolor=#d6d6d6
| 246266 ||  || — || October 4, 2007 || Kitt Peak || Spacewatch || VER || align=right | 4.1 km || 
|-id=267 bgcolor=#E9E9E9
| 246267 ||  || — || October 4, 2007 || Kitt Peak || Spacewatch || HOF || align=right | 3.1 km || 
|-id=268 bgcolor=#d6d6d6
| 246268 ||  || — || October 4, 2007 || Kitt Peak || Spacewatch || — || align=right | 3.6 km || 
|-id=269 bgcolor=#E9E9E9
| 246269 ||  || — || October 6, 2007 || Kitt Peak || Spacewatch || DOR || align=right | 2.8 km || 
|-id=270 bgcolor=#d6d6d6
| 246270 ||  || — || October 6, 2007 || Kitt Peak || Spacewatch || ALA || align=right | 5.9 km || 
|-id=271 bgcolor=#fefefe
| 246271 ||  || — || October 6, 2007 || Kitt Peak || Spacewatch || NYS || align=right data-sort-value="0.85" | 850 m || 
|-id=272 bgcolor=#fefefe
| 246272 ||  || — || October 6, 2007 || Kitt Peak || Spacewatch || FLO || align=right | 2.0 km || 
|-id=273 bgcolor=#d6d6d6
| 246273 ||  || — || October 7, 2007 || Catalina || CSS || EOS || align=right | 2.8 km || 
|-id=274 bgcolor=#d6d6d6
| 246274 ||  || — || October 7, 2007 || Catalina || CSS || TIR || align=right | 4.4 km || 
|-id=275 bgcolor=#d6d6d6
| 246275 ||  || — || October 4, 2007 || Kitt Peak || Spacewatch || — || align=right | 3.2 km || 
|-id=276 bgcolor=#E9E9E9
| 246276 ||  || — || October 4, 2007 || Kitt Peak || Spacewatch || AGN || align=right | 1.5 km || 
|-id=277 bgcolor=#d6d6d6
| 246277 ||  || — || October 4, 2007 || Kitt Peak || Spacewatch || — || align=right | 3.1 km || 
|-id=278 bgcolor=#d6d6d6
| 246278 ||  || — || October 4, 2007 || Kitt Peak || Spacewatch || — || align=right | 3.5 km || 
|-id=279 bgcolor=#d6d6d6
| 246279 ||  || — || October 4, 2007 || Kitt Peak || Spacewatch || EOS || align=right | 2.3 km || 
|-id=280 bgcolor=#d6d6d6
| 246280 ||  || — || October 7, 2007 || Mount Lemmon || Mount Lemmon Survey || HYG || align=right | 3.1 km || 
|-id=281 bgcolor=#E9E9E9
| 246281 ||  || — || October 7, 2007 || Mount Lemmon || Mount Lemmon Survey || — || align=right | 2.9 km || 
|-id=282 bgcolor=#E9E9E9
| 246282 ||  || — || October 7, 2007 || Mount Lemmon || Mount Lemmon Survey || — || align=right | 2.6 km || 
|-id=283 bgcolor=#fefefe
| 246283 ||  || — || October 5, 2007 || Bisei SG Center || BATTeRS || NYS || align=right data-sort-value="0.89" | 890 m || 
|-id=284 bgcolor=#E9E9E9
| 246284 ||  || — || October 12, 2007 || Dauban || Chante-Perdrix Obs. || — || align=right | 2.9 km || 
|-id=285 bgcolor=#d6d6d6
| 246285 ||  || — || October 7, 2007 || Catalina || CSS || — || align=right | 3.5 km || 
|-id=286 bgcolor=#d6d6d6
| 246286 ||  || — || October 8, 2007 || Anderson Mesa || LONEOS || — || align=right | 2.9 km || 
|-id=287 bgcolor=#d6d6d6
| 246287 ||  || — || October 13, 2007 || Goodricke-Pigott || R. A. Tucker || THM || align=right | 3.3 km || 
|-id=288 bgcolor=#fefefe
| 246288 ||  || — || October 7, 2007 || Socorro || LINEAR || — || align=right data-sort-value="0.99" | 990 m || 
|-id=289 bgcolor=#E9E9E9
| 246289 ||  || — || October 14, 2007 || Altschwendt || W. Ries || — || align=right | 2.6 km || 
|-id=290 bgcolor=#d6d6d6
| 246290 ||  || — || October 5, 2007 || Kitt Peak || Spacewatch || — || align=right | 4.1 km || 
|-id=291 bgcolor=#fefefe
| 246291 ||  || — || October 5, 2007 || Kitt Peak || Spacewatch || — || align=right data-sort-value="0.71" | 710 m || 
|-id=292 bgcolor=#E9E9E9
| 246292 ||  || — || October 5, 2007 || Kitt Peak || Spacewatch || — || align=right | 3.0 km || 
|-id=293 bgcolor=#fefefe
| 246293 ||  || — || October 5, 2007 || Kitt Peak || Spacewatch || NYS || align=right data-sort-value="0.83" | 830 m || 
|-id=294 bgcolor=#E9E9E9
| 246294 ||  || — || October 7, 2007 || Catalina || CSS || MRX || align=right | 1.3 km || 
|-id=295 bgcolor=#E9E9E9
| 246295 ||  || — || October 8, 2007 || Mount Lemmon || Mount Lemmon Survey || EUN || align=right | 1.3 km || 
|-id=296 bgcolor=#d6d6d6
| 246296 ||  || — || October 8, 2007 || Mount Lemmon || Mount Lemmon Survey || — || align=right | 4.0 km || 
|-id=297 bgcolor=#E9E9E9
| 246297 ||  || — || October 8, 2007 || Mount Lemmon || Mount Lemmon Survey || — || align=right | 2.9 km || 
|-id=298 bgcolor=#fefefe
| 246298 ||  || — || October 8, 2007 || Anderson Mesa || LONEOS || FLO || align=right | 1.4 km || 
|-id=299 bgcolor=#d6d6d6
| 246299 ||  || — || October 8, 2007 || Mount Lemmon || Mount Lemmon Survey || THM || align=right | 2.4 km || 
|-id=300 bgcolor=#d6d6d6
| 246300 ||  || — || October 8, 2007 || Mount Lemmon || Mount Lemmon Survey || THM || align=right | 2.5 km || 
|}

246301–246400 

|-bgcolor=#d6d6d6
| 246301 ||  || — || October 8, 2007 || Mount Lemmon || Mount Lemmon Survey || — || align=right | 3.6 km || 
|-id=302 bgcolor=#E9E9E9
| 246302 ||  || — || October 6, 2007 || Kitt Peak || Spacewatch || — || align=right | 2.7 km || 
|-id=303 bgcolor=#fefefe
| 246303 ||  || — || October 6, 2007 || Kitt Peak || Spacewatch || — || align=right data-sort-value="0.86" | 860 m || 
|-id=304 bgcolor=#fefefe
| 246304 ||  || — || October 6, 2007 || Kitt Peak || Spacewatch || FLO || align=right data-sort-value="0.75" | 750 m || 
|-id=305 bgcolor=#E9E9E9
| 246305 ||  || — || October 8, 2007 || Kitt Peak || Spacewatch || HEN || align=right | 1.2 km || 
|-id=306 bgcolor=#fefefe
| 246306 ||  || — || October 9, 2007 || Mount Lemmon || Mount Lemmon Survey || NYS || align=right data-sort-value="0.96" | 960 m || 
|-id=307 bgcolor=#fefefe
| 246307 ||  || — || October 7, 2007 || Socorro || LINEAR || — || align=right data-sort-value="0.88" | 880 m || 
|-id=308 bgcolor=#E9E9E9
| 246308 ||  || — || October 7, 2007 || Socorro || LINEAR || HNS || align=right | 1.4 km || 
|-id=309 bgcolor=#d6d6d6
| 246309 ||  || — || October 7, 2007 || Socorro || LINEAR || — || align=right | 5.5 km || 
|-id=310 bgcolor=#fefefe
| 246310 ||  || — || October 9, 2007 || Socorro || LINEAR || NYS || align=right data-sort-value="0.87" | 870 m || 
|-id=311 bgcolor=#E9E9E9
| 246311 ||  || — || October 9, 2007 || Socorro || LINEAR || HNS || align=right | 1.6 km || 
|-id=312 bgcolor=#d6d6d6
| 246312 ||  || — || October 9, 2007 || Socorro || LINEAR || — || align=right | 4.7 km || 
|-id=313 bgcolor=#d6d6d6
| 246313 ||  || — || October 9, 2007 || Socorro || LINEAR || EOS || align=right | 3.3 km || 
|-id=314 bgcolor=#E9E9E9
| 246314 ||  || — || October 11, 2007 || Socorro || LINEAR || NEM || align=right | 3.0 km || 
|-id=315 bgcolor=#fefefe
| 246315 ||  || — || October 12, 2007 || Socorro || LINEAR || — || align=right | 1.1 km || 
|-id=316 bgcolor=#fefefe
| 246316 ||  || — || October 12, 2007 || Socorro || LINEAR || NYS || align=right | 1.0 km || 
|-id=317 bgcolor=#E9E9E9
| 246317 ||  || — || October 12, 2007 || Socorro || LINEAR || — || align=right | 3.8 km || 
|-id=318 bgcolor=#E9E9E9
| 246318 ||  || — || October 12, 2007 || Socorro || LINEAR || MAR || align=right | 2.0 km || 
|-id=319 bgcolor=#d6d6d6
| 246319 ||  || — || October 13, 2007 || Socorro || LINEAR || EUP || align=right | 5.8 km || 
|-id=320 bgcolor=#fefefe
| 246320 ||  || — || October 8, 2007 || Anderson Mesa || LONEOS || FLO || align=right data-sort-value="0.71" | 710 m || 
|-id=321 bgcolor=#E9E9E9
| 246321 ||  || — || October 8, 2007 || Anderson Mesa || LONEOS || — || align=right | 3.0 km || 
|-id=322 bgcolor=#d6d6d6
| 246322 ||  || — || October 9, 2007 || Kitt Peak || Spacewatch || — || align=right | 3.7 km || 
|-id=323 bgcolor=#d6d6d6
| 246323 ||  || — || October 5, 2007 || Kitt Peak || Spacewatch || EOS || align=right | 2.1 km || 
|-id=324 bgcolor=#E9E9E9
| 246324 ||  || — || October 8, 2007 || Kitt Peak || Spacewatch || — || align=right | 1.4 km || 
|-id=325 bgcolor=#E9E9E9
| 246325 ||  || — || October 7, 2007 || Kitt Peak || Spacewatch || — || align=right | 2.4 km || 
|-id=326 bgcolor=#fefefe
| 246326 ||  || — || October 7, 2007 || Kitt Peak || Spacewatch || — || align=right | 1.1 km || 
|-id=327 bgcolor=#E9E9E9
| 246327 ||  || — || October 7, 2007 || Kitt Peak || Spacewatch || — || align=right | 1.8 km || 
|-id=328 bgcolor=#d6d6d6
| 246328 ||  || — || October 8, 2007 || Kitt Peak || Spacewatch || KAR || align=right | 1.2 km || 
|-id=329 bgcolor=#d6d6d6
| 246329 ||  || — || October 8, 2007 || Kitt Peak || Spacewatch || — || align=right | 3.2 km || 
|-id=330 bgcolor=#d6d6d6
| 246330 ||  || — || October 8, 2007 || Kitt Peak || Spacewatch || — || align=right | 3.9 km || 
|-id=331 bgcolor=#E9E9E9
| 246331 ||  || — || October 8, 2007 || Kitt Peak || Spacewatch || — || align=right | 1.3 km || 
|-id=332 bgcolor=#d6d6d6
| 246332 ||  || — || October 8, 2007 || Kitt Peak || Spacewatch || — || align=right | 3.7 km || 
|-id=333 bgcolor=#E9E9E9
| 246333 ||  || — || October 10, 2007 || Charleston || ARO || — || align=right | 3.4 km || 
|-id=334 bgcolor=#d6d6d6
| 246334 ||  || — || October 8, 2007 || Catalina || CSS || — || align=right | 4.6 km || 
|-id=335 bgcolor=#E9E9E9
| 246335 ||  || — || October 8, 2007 || Catalina || CSS || — || align=right | 3.4 km || 
|-id=336 bgcolor=#FA8072
| 246336 ||  || — || October 8, 2007 || Catalina || CSS || — || align=right data-sort-value="0.98" | 980 m || 
|-id=337 bgcolor=#d6d6d6
| 246337 ||  || — || October 8, 2007 || Catalina || CSS || EOS || align=right | 4.9 km || 
|-id=338 bgcolor=#E9E9E9
| 246338 ||  || — || October 11, 2007 || Mount Lemmon || Mount Lemmon Survey || HOF || align=right | 4.6 km || 
|-id=339 bgcolor=#E9E9E9
| 246339 ||  || — || October 10, 2007 || Kitt Peak || Spacewatch || — || align=right | 1.6 km || 
|-id=340 bgcolor=#d6d6d6
| 246340 ||  || — || October 8, 2007 || Mount Lemmon || Mount Lemmon Survey || — || align=right | 2.8 km || 
|-id=341 bgcolor=#E9E9E9
| 246341 ||  || — || October 11, 2007 || Catalina || CSS || — || align=right | 2.0 km || 
|-id=342 bgcolor=#E9E9E9
| 246342 ||  || — || October 11, 2007 || Catalina || CSS || — || align=right | 2.2 km || 
|-id=343 bgcolor=#d6d6d6
| 246343 ||  || — || October 12, 2007 || Mount Lemmon || Mount Lemmon Survey || — || align=right | 4.6 km || 
|-id=344 bgcolor=#E9E9E9
| 246344 ||  || — || October 9, 2007 || Mount Lemmon || Mount Lemmon Survey || MAR || align=right | 1.5 km || 
|-id=345 bgcolor=#d6d6d6
| 246345 Carolharris ||  ||  || October 11, 2007 || Anderson Mesa || L. H. Wasserman || HYG || align=right | 3.7 km || 
|-id=346 bgcolor=#d6d6d6
| 246346 ||  || — || October 12, 2007 || Kitt Peak || Spacewatch || HYG || align=right | 2.7 km || 
|-id=347 bgcolor=#E9E9E9
| 246347 ||  || — || October 8, 2007 || Mount Lemmon || Mount Lemmon Survey || — || align=right | 1.5 km || 
|-id=348 bgcolor=#E9E9E9
| 246348 ||  || — || October 10, 2007 || Mount Lemmon || Mount Lemmon Survey || — || align=right | 2.7 km || 
|-id=349 bgcolor=#d6d6d6
| 246349 ||  || — || October 10, 2007 || Mount Lemmon || Mount Lemmon Survey || — || align=right | 3.1 km || 
|-id=350 bgcolor=#fefefe
| 246350 ||  || — || October 11, 2007 || Catalina || CSS || — || align=right data-sort-value="0.78" | 780 m || 
|-id=351 bgcolor=#E9E9E9
| 246351 ||  || — || October 11, 2007 || Mount Lemmon || Mount Lemmon Survey || HEN || align=right | 1.3 km || 
|-id=352 bgcolor=#fefefe
| 246352 ||  || — || October 12, 2007 || Mount Lemmon || Mount Lemmon Survey || — || align=right | 1.4 km || 
|-id=353 bgcolor=#fefefe
| 246353 ||  || — || October 12, 2007 || Kitt Peak || Spacewatch || — || align=right | 1.0 km || 
|-id=354 bgcolor=#E9E9E9
| 246354 ||  || — || October 14, 2007 || Catalina || CSS || WIT || align=right | 1.5 km || 
|-id=355 bgcolor=#E9E9E9
| 246355 ||  || — || October 11, 2007 || Kitt Peak || Spacewatch || — || align=right | 3.3 km || 
|-id=356 bgcolor=#E9E9E9
| 246356 ||  || — || October 11, 2007 || Kitt Peak || Spacewatch || — || align=right | 2.2 km || 
|-id=357 bgcolor=#E9E9E9
| 246357 ||  || — || October 11, 2007 || Kitt Peak || Spacewatch || AGN || align=right | 1.7 km || 
|-id=358 bgcolor=#E9E9E9
| 246358 ||  || — || October 11, 2007 || Kitt Peak || Spacewatch || — || align=right | 2.6 km || 
|-id=359 bgcolor=#fefefe
| 246359 ||  || — || October 12, 2007 || Kitt Peak || Spacewatch || FLO || align=right data-sort-value="0.85" | 850 m || 
|-id=360 bgcolor=#E9E9E9
| 246360 ||  || — || October 11, 2007 || Catalina || CSS || — || align=right | 3.2 km || 
|-id=361 bgcolor=#E9E9E9
| 246361 ||  || — || October 9, 2007 || Kitt Peak || Spacewatch || — || align=right | 2.5 km || 
|-id=362 bgcolor=#d6d6d6
| 246362 ||  || — || October 9, 2007 || Kitt Peak || Spacewatch || — || align=right | 6.2 km || 
|-id=363 bgcolor=#d6d6d6
| 246363 ||  || — || October 12, 2007 || Mount Lemmon || Mount Lemmon Survey || — || align=right | 3.5 km || 
|-id=364 bgcolor=#d6d6d6
| 246364 ||  || — || October 15, 2007 || Catalina || CSS || — || align=right | 3.2 km || 
|-id=365 bgcolor=#fefefe
| 246365 ||  || — || October 11, 2007 || Mount Lemmon || Mount Lemmon Survey || — || align=right data-sort-value="0.97" | 970 m || 
|-id=366 bgcolor=#d6d6d6
| 246366 ||  || — || October 15, 2007 || Catalina || CSS || EOS || align=right | 4.8 km || 
|-id=367 bgcolor=#fefefe
| 246367 ||  || — || October 15, 2007 || Catalina || CSS || MAS || align=right data-sort-value="0.86" | 860 m || 
|-id=368 bgcolor=#E9E9E9
| 246368 ||  || — || October 15, 2007 || Catalina || CSS || WIT || align=right | 1.2 km || 
|-id=369 bgcolor=#d6d6d6
| 246369 ||  || — || October 15, 2007 || Kitt Peak || Spacewatch || — || align=right | 5.3 km || 
|-id=370 bgcolor=#d6d6d6
| 246370 ||  || — || October 15, 2007 || Kitt Peak || Spacewatch || — || align=right | 4.0 km || 
|-id=371 bgcolor=#d6d6d6
| 246371 ||  || — || October 13, 2007 || Kitt Peak || Spacewatch || — || align=right | 4.3 km || 
|-id=372 bgcolor=#d6d6d6
| 246372 ||  || — || October 15, 2007 || Catalina || CSS || — || align=right | 3.6 km || 
|-id=373 bgcolor=#E9E9E9
| 246373 ||  || — || October 7, 2007 || Kitt Peak || Spacewatch || — || align=right | 2.7 km || 
|-id=374 bgcolor=#d6d6d6
| 246374 ||  || — || October 10, 2007 || Catalina || CSS || — || align=right | 4.1 km || 
|-id=375 bgcolor=#d6d6d6
| 246375 ||  || — || October 8, 2007 || Catalina || CSS || — || align=right | 5.0 km || 
|-id=376 bgcolor=#fefefe
| 246376 ||  || — || October 10, 2007 || Catalina || CSS || FLO || align=right | 1.5 km || 
|-id=377 bgcolor=#d6d6d6
| 246377 ||  || — || October 12, 2007 || Kitt Peak || Spacewatch || — || align=right | 3.1 km || 
|-id=378 bgcolor=#d6d6d6
| 246378 ||  || — || October 12, 2007 || Kitt Peak || Spacewatch || MRC || align=right | 3.6 km || 
|-id=379 bgcolor=#E9E9E9
| 246379 ||  || — || October 7, 2007 || Catalina || CSS || — || align=right | 3.4 km || 
|-id=380 bgcolor=#d6d6d6
| 246380 ||  || — || October 11, 2007 || Kitt Peak || Spacewatch || — || align=right | 3.9 km || 
|-id=381 bgcolor=#fefefe
| 246381 ||  || — || October 16, 2007 || Bisei SG Center || BATTeRS || — || align=right | 1.3 km || 
|-id=382 bgcolor=#E9E9E9
| 246382 ||  || — || October 18, 2007 || Junk Bond || D. Healy || GER || align=right | 2.9 km || 
|-id=383 bgcolor=#fefefe
| 246383 ||  || — || October 19, 2007 || Socorro || LINEAR || — || align=right | 1.4 km || 
|-id=384 bgcolor=#d6d6d6
| 246384 ||  || — || October 19, 2007 || Socorro || LINEAR || AEG || align=right | 6.6 km || 
|-id=385 bgcolor=#fefefe
| 246385 ||  || — || October 17, 2007 || Anderson Mesa || LONEOS || — || align=right | 1.1 km || 
|-id=386 bgcolor=#d6d6d6
| 246386 ||  || — || October 17, 2007 || Mount Lemmon || Mount Lemmon Survey || — || align=right | 4.0 km || 
|-id=387 bgcolor=#E9E9E9
| 246387 ||  || — || October 16, 2007 || Kitt Peak || Spacewatch || — || align=right | 1.8 km || 
|-id=388 bgcolor=#d6d6d6
| 246388 ||  || — || October 16, 2007 || Kitt Peak || Spacewatch || — || align=right | 4.4 km || 
|-id=389 bgcolor=#d6d6d6
| 246389 ||  || — || October 19, 2007 || Anderson Mesa || LONEOS || — || align=right | 4.8 km || 
|-id=390 bgcolor=#fefefe
| 246390 ||  || — || October 17, 2007 || Anderson Mesa || LONEOS || V || align=right | 3.2 km || 
|-id=391 bgcolor=#d6d6d6
| 246391 ||  || — || October 20, 2007 || Mount Lemmon || Mount Lemmon Survey || — || align=right | 4.9 km || 
|-id=392 bgcolor=#E9E9E9
| 246392 ||  || — || October 20, 2007 || Catalina || CSS || — || align=right | 1.9 km || 
|-id=393 bgcolor=#fefefe
| 246393 ||  || — || October 20, 2007 || Catalina || CSS || FLO || align=right data-sort-value="0.94" | 940 m || 
|-id=394 bgcolor=#E9E9E9
| 246394 ||  || — || October 17, 2007 || Purple Mountain || PMO NEO || — || align=right | 1.6 km || 
|-id=395 bgcolor=#E9E9E9
| 246395 ||  || — || October 24, 2007 || Mount Lemmon || Mount Lemmon Survey || — || align=right | 2.2 km || 
|-id=396 bgcolor=#d6d6d6
| 246396 ||  || — || October 30, 2007 || Kitt Peak || Spacewatch || MEL || align=right | 4.5 km || 
|-id=397 bgcolor=#d6d6d6
| 246397 ||  || — || October 30, 2007 || Kitt Peak || Spacewatch || — || align=right | 4.8 km || 
|-id=398 bgcolor=#d6d6d6
| 246398 ||  || — || October 30, 2007 || Mount Lemmon || Mount Lemmon Survey || THM || align=right | 2.8 km || 
|-id=399 bgcolor=#E9E9E9
| 246399 ||  || — || October 30, 2007 || Kitt Peak || Spacewatch || HOF || align=right | 3.2 km || 
|-id=400 bgcolor=#fefefe
| 246400 ||  || — || October 31, 2007 || Mount Lemmon || Mount Lemmon Survey || NYS || align=right data-sort-value="0.76" | 760 m || 
|}

246401–246500 

|-bgcolor=#E9E9E9
| 246401 ||  || — || October 30, 2007 || Catalina || CSS || AGN || align=right | 1.6 km || 
|-id=402 bgcolor=#d6d6d6
| 246402 ||  || — || October 30, 2007 || Kitt Peak || Spacewatch || SYL7:4 || align=right | 5.5 km || 
|-id=403 bgcolor=#E9E9E9
| 246403 ||  || — || October 30, 2007 || Kitt Peak || Spacewatch || — || align=right | 2.1 km || 
|-id=404 bgcolor=#E9E9E9
| 246404 ||  || — || October 30, 2007 || Mount Lemmon || Mount Lemmon Survey || WIT || align=right | 1.4 km || 
|-id=405 bgcolor=#d6d6d6
| 246405 ||  || — || October 30, 2007 || Kitt Peak || Spacewatch || CRO || align=right | 4.0 km || 
|-id=406 bgcolor=#d6d6d6
| 246406 ||  || — || October 30, 2007 || Catalina || CSS || EOS || align=right | 3.1 km || 
|-id=407 bgcolor=#E9E9E9
| 246407 ||  || — || October 30, 2007 || Kitt Peak || Spacewatch || EUN || align=right | 1.8 km || 
|-id=408 bgcolor=#E9E9E9
| 246408 ||  || — || October 31, 2007 || Kitt Peak || Spacewatch || NEM || align=right | 2.6 km || 
|-id=409 bgcolor=#d6d6d6
| 246409 ||  || — || October 31, 2007 || Kitt Peak || Spacewatch || — || align=right | 2.8 km || 
|-id=410 bgcolor=#d6d6d6
| 246410 ||  || — || October 31, 2007 || Kitt Peak || Spacewatch || — || align=right | 3.7 km || 
|-id=411 bgcolor=#fefefe
| 246411 ||  || — || October 31, 2007 || Catalina || CSS || — || align=right | 1.1 km || 
|-id=412 bgcolor=#d6d6d6
| 246412 ||  || — || October 29, 2007 || Siding Spring || SSS || — || align=right | 5.8 km || 
|-id=413 bgcolor=#E9E9E9
| 246413 ||  || — || October 31, 2007 || Catalina || CSS || EUN || align=right | 1.9 km || 
|-id=414 bgcolor=#d6d6d6
| 246414 ||  || — || October 17, 2007 || Mount Lemmon || Mount Lemmon Survey || — || align=right | 4.4 km || 
|-id=415 bgcolor=#d6d6d6
| 246415 ||  || — || November 2, 2007 || 7300 || W. K. Y. Yeung || — || align=right | 3.8 km || 
|-id=416 bgcolor=#fefefe
| 246416 ||  || — || November 2, 2007 || Dauban || Chante-Perdrix Obs. || V || align=right data-sort-value="0.93" | 930 m || 
|-id=417 bgcolor=#fefefe
| 246417 ||  || — || November 2, 2007 || Dauban || Chante-Perdrix Obs. || — || align=right | 1.2 km || 
|-id=418 bgcolor=#d6d6d6
| 246418 ||  || — || November 2, 2007 || Mount Lemmon || Mount Lemmon Survey || — || align=right | 3.3 km || 
|-id=419 bgcolor=#d6d6d6
| 246419 ||  || — || November 2, 2007 || Kitt Peak || Spacewatch || — || align=right | 3.5 km || 
|-id=420 bgcolor=#E9E9E9
| 246420 ||  || — || November 2, 2007 || Kitt Peak || Spacewatch || HOF || align=right | 3.1 km || 
|-id=421 bgcolor=#d6d6d6
| 246421 ||  || — || November 2, 2007 || Kitt Peak || Spacewatch || — || align=right | 3.9 km || 
|-id=422 bgcolor=#E9E9E9
| 246422 ||  || — || November 1, 2007 || Kitt Peak || Spacewatch || — || align=right | 2.2 km || 
|-id=423 bgcolor=#d6d6d6
| 246423 ||  || — || November 1, 2007 || Kitt Peak || Spacewatch || — || align=right | 4.2 km || 
|-id=424 bgcolor=#d6d6d6
| 246424 ||  || — || November 1, 2007 || Kitt Peak || Spacewatch || — || align=right | 4.4 km || 
|-id=425 bgcolor=#d6d6d6
| 246425 ||  || — || November 1, 2007 || Kitt Peak || Spacewatch || — || align=right | 3.8 km || 
|-id=426 bgcolor=#E9E9E9
| 246426 ||  || — || November 1, 2007 || Kitt Peak || Spacewatch || — || align=right | 3.1 km || 
|-id=427 bgcolor=#fefefe
| 246427 ||  || — || November 1, 2007 || Kitt Peak || Spacewatch || — || align=right | 1.2 km || 
|-id=428 bgcolor=#E9E9E9
| 246428 ||  || — || November 1, 2007 || Kitt Peak || Spacewatch || HOF || align=right | 3.8 km || 
|-id=429 bgcolor=#d6d6d6
| 246429 ||  || — || November 2, 2007 || Kitt Peak || Spacewatch || — || align=right | 4.0 km || 
|-id=430 bgcolor=#E9E9E9
| 246430 ||  || — || November 2, 2007 || Socorro || LINEAR || WIT || align=right | 1.5 km || 
|-id=431 bgcolor=#d6d6d6
| 246431 ||  || — || November 2, 2007 || Socorro || LINEAR || — || align=right | 4.7 km || 
|-id=432 bgcolor=#E9E9E9
| 246432 ||  || — || November 3, 2007 || Socorro || LINEAR || — || align=right | 3.4 km || 
|-id=433 bgcolor=#fefefe
| 246433 ||  || — || November 4, 2007 || Socorro || LINEAR || — || align=right | 1.1 km || 
|-id=434 bgcolor=#d6d6d6
| 246434 ||  || — || November 7, 2007 || Socorro || LINEAR || CHA || align=right | 3.1 km || 
|-id=435 bgcolor=#E9E9E9
| 246435 ||  || — || November 3, 2007 || Kitt Peak || Spacewatch || AST || align=right | 3.5 km || 
|-id=436 bgcolor=#E9E9E9
| 246436 ||  || — || November 3, 2007 || Kitt Peak || Spacewatch || — || align=right | 3.1 km || 
|-id=437 bgcolor=#fefefe
| 246437 ||  || — || November 6, 2007 || Kitt Peak || Spacewatch || — || align=right | 1.3 km || 
|-id=438 bgcolor=#d6d6d6
| 246438 ||  || — || November 4, 2007 || Mount Lemmon || Mount Lemmon Survey || — || align=right | 3.4 km || 
|-id=439 bgcolor=#E9E9E9
| 246439 ||  || — || November 4, 2007 || Kitt Peak || Spacewatch || — || align=right | 1.4 km || 
|-id=440 bgcolor=#E9E9E9
| 246440 ||  || — || November 5, 2007 || Kitt Peak || Spacewatch || — || align=right | 1.2 km || 
|-id=441 bgcolor=#E9E9E9
| 246441 ||  || — || November 5, 2007 || Kitt Peak || Spacewatch || — || align=right | 1.3 km || 
|-id=442 bgcolor=#d6d6d6
| 246442 ||  || — || November 5, 2007 || Kitt Peak || Spacewatch || — || align=right | 4.6 km || 
|-id=443 bgcolor=#d6d6d6
| 246443 ||  || — || November 6, 2007 || Kitt Peak || Spacewatch || — || align=right | 4.5 km || 
|-id=444 bgcolor=#d6d6d6
| 246444 ||  || — || November 6, 2007 || Kitt Peak || Spacewatch || — || align=right | 4.5 km || 
|-id=445 bgcolor=#d6d6d6
| 246445 ||  || — || November 6, 2007 || Purple Mountain || PMO NEO || — || align=right | 4.0 km || 
|-id=446 bgcolor=#E9E9E9
| 246446 ||  || — || November 9, 2007 || Kitt Peak || Spacewatch || PAD || align=right | 2.1 km || 
|-id=447 bgcolor=#d6d6d6
| 246447 ||  || — || November 14, 2007 || Mayhill || A. Lowe || — || align=right | 5.6 km || 
|-id=448 bgcolor=#d6d6d6
| 246448 ||  || — || November 4, 2007 || Mount Lemmon || Mount Lemmon Survey || — || align=right | 6.3 km || 
|-id=449 bgcolor=#E9E9E9
| 246449 ||  || — || November 9, 2007 || Kitt Peak || Spacewatch || — || align=right | 1.2 km || 
|-id=450 bgcolor=#E9E9E9
| 246450 ||  || — || November 9, 2007 || Kitt Peak || Spacewatch || AGN || align=right | 1.3 km || 
|-id=451 bgcolor=#E9E9E9
| 246451 ||  || — || November 9, 2007 || Mount Lemmon || Mount Lemmon Survey || — || align=right | 1.4 km || 
|-id=452 bgcolor=#d6d6d6
| 246452 ||  || — || November 7, 2007 || Kitt Peak || Spacewatch || — || align=right | 2.9 km || 
|-id=453 bgcolor=#d6d6d6
| 246453 ||  || — || November 13, 2007 || Anderson Mesa || LONEOS || KOR || align=right | 2.0 km || 
|-id=454 bgcolor=#E9E9E9
| 246454 ||  || — || November 12, 2007 || Catalina || CSS || — || align=right | 1.8 km || 
|-id=455 bgcolor=#d6d6d6
| 246455 ||  || — || November 12, 2007 || Catalina || CSS || — || align=right | 4.3 km || 
|-id=456 bgcolor=#d6d6d6
| 246456 ||  || — || November 13, 2007 || Mount Lemmon || Mount Lemmon Survey || — || align=right | 4.5 km || 
|-id=457 bgcolor=#E9E9E9
| 246457 ||  || — || November 14, 2007 || Bisei SG Center || BATTeRS || PAD || align=right | 2.0 km || 
|-id=458 bgcolor=#d6d6d6
| 246458 ||  || — || November 8, 2007 || Catalina || CSS || — || align=right | 5.4 km || 
|-id=459 bgcolor=#d6d6d6
| 246459 ||  || — || November 11, 2007 || Purple Mountain || PMO NEO || LIX || align=right | 5.2 km || 
|-id=460 bgcolor=#fefefe
| 246460 ||  || — || November 11, 2007 || Mount Lemmon || Mount Lemmon Survey || NYS || align=right data-sort-value="0.72" | 720 m || 
|-id=461 bgcolor=#d6d6d6
| 246461 ||  || — || November 12, 2007 || Socorro || LINEAR || — || align=right | 4.1 km || 
|-id=462 bgcolor=#E9E9E9
| 246462 ||  || — || November 13, 2007 || Kitt Peak || Spacewatch || — || align=right | 3.5 km || 
|-id=463 bgcolor=#d6d6d6
| 246463 ||  || — || November 14, 2007 || Kitt Peak || Spacewatch || TEL || align=right | 2.1 km || 
|-id=464 bgcolor=#d6d6d6
| 246464 ||  || — || November 11, 2007 || Catalina || CSS || — || align=right | 4.5 km || 
|-id=465 bgcolor=#d6d6d6
| 246465 ||  || — || November 4, 2007 || Catalina || CSS || — || align=right | 6.3 km || 
|-id=466 bgcolor=#d6d6d6
| 246466 ||  || — || November 11, 2007 || Mount Lemmon || Mount Lemmon Survey || 628 || align=right | 2.6 km || 
|-id=467 bgcolor=#d6d6d6
| 246467 ||  || — || November 7, 2007 || Kitt Peak || Spacewatch || — || align=right | 4.7 km || 
|-id=468 bgcolor=#d6d6d6
| 246468 ||  || — || November 5, 2007 || Kitt Peak || Spacewatch || — || align=right | 3.4 km || 
|-id=469 bgcolor=#d6d6d6
| 246469 ||  || — || November 9, 2007 || Mount Lemmon || Mount Lemmon Survey || — || align=right | 4.3 km || 
|-id=470 bgcolor=#E9E9E9
| 246470 ||  || — || November 3, 2007 || Kitt Peak || Spacewatch || — || align=right | 1.8 km || 
|-id=471 bgcolor=#d6d6d6
| 246471 ||  || — || November 18, 2007 || Socorro || LINEAR || — || align=right | 4.3 km || 
|-id=472 bgcolor=#d6d6d6
| 246472 ||  || — || November 18, 2007 || Mount Lemmon || Mount Lemmon Survey || — || align=right | 3.3 km || 
|-id=473 bgcolor=#d6d6d6
| 246473 ||  || — || November 18, 2007 || Mount Lemmon || Mount Lemmon Survey || — || align=right | 2.8 km || 
|-id=474 bgcolor=#d6d6d6
| 246474 ||  || — || November 17, 2007 || Kitt Peak || Spacewatch || CHA || align=right | 2.8 km || 
|-id=475 bgcolor=#d6d6d6
| 246475 ||  || — || November 19, 2007 || Kitt Peak || Spacewatch || — || align=right | 4.0 km || 
|-id=476 bgcolor=#d6d6d6
| 246476 ||  || — || November 16, 2007 || Catalina || CSS || — || align=right | 4.6 km || 
|-id=477 bgcolor=#d6d6d6
| 246477 ||  || — || November 17, 2007 || Mount Lemmon || Mount Lemmon Survey || EOS || align=right | 2.5 km || 
|-id=478 bgcolor=#E9E9E9
| 246478 ||  || — || November 18, 2007 || Mount Lemmon || Mount Lemmon Survey || HEN || align=right | 1.2 km || 
|-id=479 bgcolor=#E9E9E9
| 246479 ||  || — || November 19, 2007 || Mount Lemmon || Mount Lemmon Survey || — || align=right | 4.8 km || 
|-id=480 bgcolor=#E9E9E9
| 246480 ||  || — || December 3, 2007 || Catalina || CSS || HOF || align=right | 3.4 km || 
|-id=481 bgcolor=#d6d6d6
| 246481 ||  || — || December 3, 2007 || Catalina || CSS || KOR || align=right | 1.7 km || 
|-id=482 bgcolor=#d6d6d6
| 246482 ||  || — || December 3, 2007 || Kitt Peak || Spacewatch || KOR || align=right | 1.5 km || 
|-id=483 bgcolor=#E9E9E9
| 246483 ||  || — || December 3, 2007 || Calvin-Rehoboth || Calvin–Rehoboth Obs. || — || align=right | 2.1 km || 
|-id=484 bgcolor=#d6d6d6
| 246484 ||  || — || December 4, 2007 || Catalina || CSS || SAN || align=right | 2.3 km || 
|-id=485 bgcolor=#d6d6d6
| 246485 ||  || — || December 12, 2007 || Great Shefford || P. Birtwhistle || — || align=right | 6.5 km || 
|-id=486 bgcolor=#E9E9E9
| 246486 ||  || — || December 14, 2007 || Majorca || OAM Obs. || — || align=right | 4.5 km || 
|-id=487 bgcolor=#d6d6d6
| 246487 ||  || — || December 14, 2007 || La Sagra || OAM Obs. || — || align=right | 4.2 km || 
|-id=488 bgcolor=#E9E9E9
| 246488 ||  || — || December 15, 2007 || Catalina || CSS || — || align=right | 1.5 km || 
|-id=489 bgcolor=#d6d6d6
| 246489 ||  || — || December 15, 2007 || Kitt Peak || Spacewatch || HYG || align=right | 3.7 km || 
|-id=490 bgcolor=#E9E9E9
| 246490 ||  || — || December 3, 2007 || Kitt Peak || Spacewatch || — || align=right | 1.2 km || 
|-id=491 bgcolor=#d6d6d6
| 246491 ||  || — || December 16, 2007 || Kitt Peak || Spacewatch || EUP || align=right | 5.5 km || 
|-id=492 bgcolor=#E9E9E9
| 246492 ||  || — || December 30, 2007 || Catalina || CSS || MIT || align=right | 3.9 km || 
|-id=493 bgcolor=#d6d6d6
| 246493 ||  || — || December 30, 2007 || Kitt Peak || Spacewatch || KOR || align=right | 2.0 km || 
|-id=494 bgcolor=#d6d6d6
| 246494 ||  || — || December 30, 2007 || Kitt Peak || Spacewatch || — || align=right | 3.3 km || 
|-id=495 bgcolor=#E9E9E9
| 246495 ||  || — || December 31, 2007 || Kitt Peak || Spacewatch || — || align=right | 3.6 km || 
|-id=496 bgcolor=#d6d6d6
| 246496 ||  || — || January 10, 2008 || Kitt Peak || Spacewatch || 3:2 || align=right | 7.7 km || 
|-id=497 bgcolor=#d6d6d6
| 246497 ||  || — || January 10, 2008 || Kitt Peak || Spacewatch || 3:2 || align=right | 6.9 km || 
|-id=498 bgcolor=#E9E9E9
| 246498 ||  || — || January 10, 2008 || Mount Lemmon || Mount Lemmon Survey || — || align=right | 3.5 km || 
|-id=499 bgcolor=#d6d6d6
| 246499 ||  || — || January 10, 2008 || Kitt Peak || Spacewatch || KOR || align=right | 1.4 km || 
|-id=500 bgcolor=#E9E9E9
| 246500 ||  || — || January 10, 2008 || Kitt Peak || Spacewatch || ADE || align=right | 3.3 km || 
|}

246501–246600 

|-bgcolor=#d6d6d6
| 246501 ||  || — || January 11, 2008 || Kitt Peak || Spacewatch || — || align=right | 4.0 km || 
|-id=502 bgcolor=#d6d6d6
| 246502 ||  || — || January 13, 2008 || Mount Lemmon || Mount Lemmon Survey || — || align=right | 5.8 km || 
|-id=503 bgcolor=#d6d6d6
| 246503 ||  || — || January 11, 2008 || Kitt Peak || Spacewatch || — || align=right | 3.5 km || 
|-id=504 bgcolor=#d6d6d6
| 246504 Hualien ||  ||  || January 28, 2008 || Lulin Observatory || C.-S. Lin, Q.-z. Ye || — || align=right | 5.9 km || 
|-id=505 bgcolor=#d6d6d6
| 246505 ||  || — || January 30, 2008 || Kitt Peak || Spacewatch || — || align=right | 6.5 km || 
|-id=506 bgcolor=#d6d6d6
| 246506 ||  || — || January 19, 2008 || Mount Lemmon || Mount Lemmon Survey || — || align=right | 4.5 km || 
|-id=507 bgcolor=#E9E9E9
| 246507 ||  || — || February 2, 2008 || Mount Lemmon || Mount Lemmon Survey || NEM || align=right | 2.6 km || 
|-id=508 bgcolor=#d6d6d6
| 246508 ||  || — || February 6, 2008 || Catalina || CSS || EOS || align=right | 2.6 km || 
|-id=509 bgcolor=#E9E9E9
| 246509 ||  || — || February 7, 2008 || Mount Lemmon || Mount Lemmon Survey || PAD || align=right | 3.3 km || 
|-id=510 bgcolor=#d6d6d6
| 246510 ||  || — || February 9, 2008 || Mount Lemmon || Mount Lemmon Survey || — || align=right | 3.2 km || 
|-id=511 bgcolor=#d6d6d6
| 246511 ||  || — || February 8, 2008 || Kitt Peak || Spacewatch || — || align=right | 3.6 km || 
|-id=512 bgcolor=#d6d6d6
| 246512 ||  || — || February 11, 2008 || Mount Lemmon || Mount Lemmon Survey || — || align=right | 3.0 km || 
|-id=513 bgcolor=#E9E9E9
| 246513 ||  || — || February 11, 2008 || Kitt Peak || Spacewatch || — || align=right | 1.8 km || 
|-id=514 bgcolor=#d6d6d6
| 246514 ||  || — || February 2, 2008 || Kitt Peak || Spacewatch || — || align=right | 3.7 km || 
|-id=515 bgcolor=#d6d6d6
| 246515 ||  || — || February 3, 2008 || Kitt Peak || Spacewatch || — || align=right | 4.1 km || 
|-id=516 bgcolor=#E9E9E9
| 246516 ||  || — || February 7, 2008 || Mount Lemmon || Mount Lemmon Survey || — || align=right | 2.7 km || 
|-id=517 bgcolor=#E9E9E9
| 246517 ||  || — || February 24, 2008 || Kitt Peak || Spacewatch || — || align=right | 3.5 km || 
|-id=518 bgcolor=#d6d6d6
| 246518 ||  || — || February 27, 2008 || Kitt Peak || Spacewatch || — || align=right | 4.4 km || 
|-id=519 bgcolor=#d6d6d6
| 246519 ||  || — || February 28, 2008 || Kitt Peak || Spacewatch || URS || align=right | 5.5 km || 
|-id=520 bgcolor=#E9E9E9
| 246520 ||  || — || February 28, 2008 || Catalina || CSS || — || align=right | 2.5 km || 
|-id=521 bgcolor=#d6d6d6
| 246521 ||  || — || March 7, 2008 || Kitt Peak || Spacewatch || URS || align=right | 3.3 km || 
|-id=522 bgcolor=#d6d6d6
| 246522 ||  || — || March 2, 2008 || Catalina || CSS || — || align=right | 7.4 km || 
|-id=523 bgcolor=#C2FFFF
| 246523 ||  || — || March 9, 2008 || Kitt Peak || Spacewatch || L5 || align=right | 12 km || 
|-id=524 bgcolor=#d6d6d6
| 246524 ||  || — || March 13, 2008 || Catalina || CSS || — || align=right | 4.2 km || 
|-id=525 bgcolor=#E9E9E9
| 246525 ||  || — || March 28, 2008 || Mount Lemmon || Mount Lemmon Survey || HOF || align=right | 3.5 km || 
|-id=526 bgcolor=#d6d6d6
| 246526 ||  || — || March 29, 2008 || Mount Lemmon || Mount Lemmon Survey || — || align=right | 4.4 km || 
|-id=527 bgcolor=#C2FFFF
| 246527 ||  || — || March 29, 2008 || Kitt Peak || Spacewatch || L5 || align=right | 14 km || 
|-id=528 bgcolor=#d6d6d6
| 246528 ||  || — || March 31, 2008 || Kitt Peak || Spacewatch || — || align=right | 3.8 km || 
|-id=529 bgcolor=#d6d6d6
| 246529 ||  || — || April 6, 2008 || Mount Lemmon || Mount Lemmon Survey || — || align=right | 3.2 km || 
|-id=530 bgcolor=#C2FFFF
| 246530 ||  || — || April 11, 2008 || Mount Lemmon || Mount Lemmon Survey || L5 || align=right | 11 km || 
|-id=531 bgcolor=#d6d6d6
| 246531 ||  || — || April 14, 2008 || Mount Lemmon || Mount Lemmon Survey || — || align=right | 3.7 km || 
|-id=532 bgcolor=#d6d6d6
| 246532 ||  || — || April 29, 2008 || Dauban || F. Kugel || VER || align=right | 4.3 km || 
|-id=533 bgcolor=#C2FFFF
| 246533 ||  || — || April 26, 2008 || Mount Lemmon || Mount Lemmon Survey || L5 || align=right | 9.0 km || 
|-id=534 bgcolor=#C2FFFF
| 246534 ||  || — || May 31, 2008 || Kitt Peak || Spacewatch || L5 || align=right | 14 km || 
|-id=535 bgcolor=#d6d6d6
| 246535 ||  || — || June 30, 2008 || Siding Spring || SSS || — || align=right | 5.5 km || 
|-id=536 bgcolor=#fefefe
| 246536 ||  || — || July 9, 2008 || Dauban || F. Kugel || — || align=right | 1.1 km || 
|-id=537 bgcolor=#fefefe
| 246537 ||  || — || August 7, 2008 || La Sagra || OAM Obs. || — || align=right | 1.1 km || 
|-id=538 bgcolor=#d6d6d6
| 246538 ||  || — || August 25, 2008 || Dauban || F. Kugel || — || align=right | 4.0 km || 
|-id=539 bgcolor=#d6d6d6
| 246539 ||  || — || September 3, 2008 || Kitt Peak || Spacewatch || — || align=right | 3.6 km || 
|-id=540 bgcolor=#fefefe
| 246540 ||  || — || September 2, 2008 || Kitt Peak || Spacewatch || — || align=right | 1.0 km || 
|-id=541 bgcolor=#E9E9E9
| 246541 ||  || — || September 2, 2008 || Kitt Peak || Spacewatch || — || align=right | 1.5 km || 
|-id=542 bgcolor=#E9E9E9
| 246542 ||  || — || September 4, 2008 || Kitt Peak || Spacewatch || HOF || align=right | 3.9 km || 
|-id=543 bgcolor=#fefefe
| 246543 ||  || — || September 3, 2008 || Kitt Peak || Spacewatch || V || align=right data-sort-value="0.76" | 760 m || 
|-id=544 bgcolor=#E9E9E9
| 246544 ||  || — || September 3, 2008 || Kitt Peak || Spacewatch || — || align=right | 3.9 km || 
|-id=545 bgcolor=#E9E9E9
| 246545 ||  || — || September 4, 2008 || Kitt Peak || Spacewatch || HOF || align=right | 3.6 km || 
|-id=546 bgcolor=#C2FFFF
| 246546 ||  || — || September 24, 2008 || Kitt Peak || Spacewatch || L4 || align=right | 11 km || 
|-id=547 bgcolor=#fefefe
| 246547 ||  || — || September 20, 2008 || Mount Lemmon || Mount Lemmon Survey || — || align=right | 1.2 km || 
|-id=548 bgcolor=#d6d6d6
| 246548 ||  || — || September 19, 2008 || Kitt Peak || Spacewatch || — || align=right | 4.2 km || 
|-id=549 bgcolor=#E9E9E9
| 246549 ||  || — || September 20, 2008 || Mount Lemmon || Mount Lemmon Survey || — || align=right | 3.6 km || 
|-id=550 bgcolor=#C2FFFF
| 246550 ||  || — || September 20, 2008 || Catalina || CSS || L4 || align=right | 15 km || 
|-id=551 bgcolor=#E9E9E9
| 246551 ||  || — || September 22, 2008 || Kitt Peak || Spacewatch || — || align=right | 2.3 km || 
|-id=552 bgcolor=#fefefe
| 246552 ||  || — || September 21, 2008 || Kitt Peak || Spacewatch || H || align=right data-sort-value="0.65" | 650 m || 
|-id=553 bgcolor=#d6d6d6
| 246553 ||  || — || September 21, 2008 || Kitt Peak || Spacewatch || EMA || align=right | 4.5 km || 
|-id=554 bgcolor=#E9E9E9
| 246554 ||  || — || September 21, 2008 || Kitt Peak || Spacewatch || DOR || align=right | 3.7 km || 
|-id=555 bgcolor=#E9E9E9
| 246555 ||  || — || September 21, 2008 || Kitt Peak || Spacewatch || — || align=right | 2.4 km || 
|-id=556 bgcolor=#E9E9E9
| 246556 ||  || — || September 21, 2008 || Mount Lemmon || Mount Lemmon Survey || — || align=right | 3.2 km || 
|-id=557 bgcolor=#d6d6d6
| 246557 ||  || — || September 22, 2008 || Kitt Peak || Spacewatch || — || align=right | 4.1 km || 
|-id=558 bgcolor=#E9E9E9
| 246558 ||  || — || September 22, 2008 || Mount Lemmon || Mount Lemmon Survey || — || align=right | 3.3 km || 
|-id=559 bgcolor=#E9E9E9
| 246559 ||  || — || September 24, 2008 || Mount Lemmon || Mount Lemmon Survey || — || align=right | 1.4 km || 
|-id=560 bgcolor=#C2FFFF
| 246560 ||  || — || September 24, 2008 || Socorro || LINEAR || L4 || align=right | 12 km || 
|-id=561 bgcolor=#d6d6d6
| 246561 ||  || — || September 24, 2008 || Socorro || LINEAR || — || align=right | 2.7 km || 
|-id=562 bgcolor=#E9E9E9
| 246562 ||  || — || September 28, 2008 || Socorro || LINEAR || — || align=right | 1.5 km || 
|-id=563 bgcolor=#E9E9E9
| 246563 ||  || — || September 22, 2008 || Kitt Peak || Spacewatch || HOF || align=right | 3.1 km || 
|-id=564 bgcolor=#d6d6d6
| 246564 ||  || — || September 24, 2008 || Kitt Peak || Spacewatch || — || align=right | 2.8 km || 
|-id=565 bgcolor=#E9E9E9
| 246565 ||  || — || September 25, 2008 || Kitt Peak || Spacewatch || EUN || align=right | 1.3 km || 
|-id=566 bgcolor=#E9E9E9
| 246566 ||  || — || September 25, 2008 || Kitt Peak || Spacewatch || — || align=right | 2.5 km || 
|-id=567 bgcolor=#d6d6d6
| 246567 ||  || — || September 23, 2008 || Kitt Peak || Spacewatch || KOR || align=right | 1.3 km || 
|-id=568 bgcolor=#E9E9E9
| 246568 ||  || — || September 24, 2008 || Mount Lemmon || Mount Lemmon Survey || HNS || align=right | 1.3 km || 
|-id=569 bgcolor=#d6d6d6
| 246569 ||  || — || October 1, 2008 || Mount Lemmon || Mount Lemmon Survey || — || align=right | 2.5 km || 
|-id=570 bgcolor=#E9E9E9
| 246570 ||  || — || October 1, 2008 || Mount Lemmon || Mount Lemmon Survey || — || align=right | 1.2 km || 
|-id=571 bgcolor=#fefefe
| 246571 ||  || — || October 2, 2008 || Kitt Peak || Spacewatch || — || align=right | 1.2 km || 
|-id=572 bgcolor=#d6d6d6
| 246572 ||  || — || October 2, 2008 || Kitt Peak || Spacewatch || — || align=right | 2.8 km || 
|-id=573 bgcolor=#E9E9E9
| 246573 ||  || — || October 6, 2008 || Catalina || CSS || — || align=right | 3.5 km || 
|-id=574 bgcolor=#d6d6d6
| 246574 ||  || — || October 8, 2008 || Kitt Peak || Spacewatch || ANF || align=right | 1.7 km || 
|-id=575 bgcolor=#d6d6d6
| 246575 ||  || — || October 1, 2008 || Kitt Peak || Spacewatch || — || align=right | 2.9 km || 
|-id=576 bgcolor=#E9E9E9
| 246576 ||  || — || October 8, 2008 || Catalina || CSS || INO || align=right | 1.5 km || 
|-id=577 bgcolor=#E9E9E9
| 246577 ||  || — || October 3, 2008 || Mount Lemmon || Mount Lemmon Survey || — || align=right | 1.4 km || 
|-id=578 bgcolor=#d6d6d6
| 246578 ||  || — || October 24, 2008 || Socorro || LINEAR || 3:2 || align=right | 6.9 km || 
|-id=579 bgcolor=#fefefe
| 246579 ||  || — || October 20, 2008 || Kitt Peak || Spacewatch || — || align=right data-sort-value="0.69" | 690 m || 
|-id=580 bgcolor=#d6d6d6
| 246580 ||  || — || October 20, 2008 || Kitt Peak || Spacewatch || EUP || align=right | 5.2 km || 
|-id=581 bgcolor=#d6d6d6
| 246581 ||  || — || October 20, 2008 || Kitt Peak || Spacewatch || — || align=right | 2.8 km || 
|-id=582 bgcolor=#fefefe
| 246582 ||  || — || October 20, 2008 || Kitt Peak || Spacewatch || — || align=right data-sort-value="0.92" | 920 m || 
|-id=583 bgcolor=#fefefe
| 246583 ||  || — || October 21, 2008 || Mount Lemmon || Mount Lemmon Survey || — || align=right | 1.3 km || 
|-id=584 bgcolor=#fefefe
| 246584 ||  || — || October 23, 2008 || Mount Lemmon || Mount Lemmon Survey || — || align=right data-sort-value="0.85" | 850 m || 
|-id=585 bgcolor=#fefefe
| 246585 ||  || — || October 24, 2008 || Kitt Peak || Spacewatch || FLO || align=right data-sort-value="0.70" | 700 m || 
|-id=586 bgcolor=#fefefe
| 246586 ||  || — || October 24, 2008 || Socorro || LINEAR || V || align=right | 1.0 km || 
|-id=587 bgcolor=#E9E9E9
| 246587 ||  || — || October 25, 2008 || Socorro || LINEAR || MAR || align=right | 1.4 km || 
|-id=588 bgcolor=#E9E9E9
| 246588 ||  || — || October 25, 2008 || Socorro || LINEAR || — || align=right | 3.7 km || 
|-id=589 bgcolor=#fefefe
| 246589 ||  || — || October 22, 2008 || Kitt Peak || Spacewatch || ERI || align=right | 1.9 km || 
|-id=590 bgcolor=#d6d6d6
| 246590 ||  || — || October 22, 2008 || Kitt Peak || Spacewatch || EOS || align=right | 2.8 km || 
|-id=591 bgcolor=#E9E9E9
| 246591 ||  || — || October 23, 2008 || Kitt Peak || Spacewatch || — || align=right | 1.2 km || 
|-id=592 bgcolor=#E9E9E9
| 246592 ||  || — || October 23, 2008 || Kitt Peak || Spacewatch || — || align=right | 1.3 km || 
|-id=593 bgcolor=#d6d6d6
| 246593 ||  || — || October 23, 2008 || Mount Lemmon || Mount Lemmon Survey || — || align=right | 3.7 km || 
|-id=594 bgcolor=#E9E9E9
| 246594 ||  || — || October 24, 2008 || Kitt Peak || Spacewatch || — || align=right | 1.2 km || 
|-id=595 bgcolor=#E9E9E9
| 246595 ||  || — || October 26, 2008 || Mount Lemmon || Mount Lemmon Survey || — || align=right | 1.6 km || 
|-id=596 bgcolor=#E9E9E9
| 246596 ||  || — || October 27, 2008 || Kitt Peak || Spacewatch || — || align=right | 3.5 km || 
|-id=597 bgcolor=#d6d6d6
| 246597 ||  || — || October 28, 2008 || Mount Lemmon || Mount Lemmon Survey || — || align=right | 3.8 km || 
|-id=598 bgcolor=#d6d6d6
| 246598 ||  || — || October 30, 2008 || Mount Lemmon || Mount Lemmon Survey || — || align=right | 7.1 km || 
|-id=599 bgcolor=#fefefe
| 246599 ||  || — || October 31, 2008 || Catalina || CSS || PHO || align=right | 1.6 km || 
|-id=600 bgcolor=#fefefe
| 246600 ||  || — || October 31, 2008 || Mount Lemmon || Mount Lemmon Survey || V || align=right | 1.0 km || 
|}

246601–246700 

|-bgcolor=#fefefe
| 246601 ||  || — || October 30, 2008 || Mount Lemmon || Mount Lemmon Survey || FLO || align=right data-sort-value="0.74" | 740 m || 
|-id=602 bgcolor=#E9E9E9
| 246602 ||  || — || October 21, 2008 || Kitt Peak || Spacewatch || — || align=right | 2.9 km || 
|-id=603 bgcolor=#d6d6d6
| 246603 ||  || — || October 29, 2008 || Kitt Peak || Spacewatch || EOS || align=right | 4.9 km || 
|-id=604 bgcolor=#d6d6d6
| 246604 ||  || — || October 31, 2008 || Mount Lemmon || Mount Lemmon Survey || HYG || align=right | 5.2 km || 
|-id=605 bgcolor=#fefefe
| 246605 ||  || — || November 1, 2008 || Mount Lemmon || Mount Lemmon Survey || — || align=right data-sort-value="0.83" | 830 m || 
|-id=606 bgcolor=#d6d6d6
| 246606 ||  || — || November 1, 2008 || Mount Lemmon || Mount Lemmon Survey || — || align=right | 2.8 km || 
|-id=607 bgcolor=#E9E9E9
| 246607 ||  || — || November 2, 2008 || Kitt Peak || Spacewatch || — || align=right | 2.3 km || 
|-id=608 bgcolor=#E9E9E9
| 246608 ||  || — || November 9, 2008 || La Sagra || OAM Obs. || — || align=right | 3.3 km || 
|-id=609 bgcolor=#d6d6d6
| 246609 ||  || — || November 7, 2008 || Mount Lemmon || Mount Lemmon Survey || URS || align=right | 4.7 km || 
|-id=610 bgcolor=#d6d6d6
| 246610 ||  || — || November 3, 2008 || Kitt Peak || Spacewatch || — || align=right | 4.6 km || 
|-id=611 bgcolor=#E9E9E9
| 246611 ||  || — || November 6, 2008 || Mount Lemmon || Mount Lemmon Survey || — || align=right | 2.2 km || 
|-id=612 bgcolor=#E9E9E9
| 246612 ||  || — || November 7, 2008 || Catalina || CSS || — || align=right | 2.3 km || 
|-id=613 bgcolor=#E9E9E9
| 246613 ||  || — || November 3, 2008 || Catalina || CSS || — || align=right | 3.7 km || 
|-id=614 bgcolor=#fefefe
| 246614 ||  || — || November 6, 2008 || Mount Lemmon || Mount Lemmon Survey || — || align=right data-sort-value="0.78" | 780 m || 
|-id=615 bgcolor=#E9E9E9
| 246615 ||  || — || November 9, 2008 || Mount Lemmon || Mount Lemmon Survey || — || align=right | 3.6 km || 
|-id=616 bgcolor=#fefefe
| 246616 ||  || — || November 7, 2008 || Mount Lemmon || Mount Lemmon Survey || NYS || align=right | 1.5 km || 
|-id=617 bgcolor=#fefefe
| 246617 ||  || — || November 19, 2008 || Bisei SG Center || BATTeRS || H || align=right | 1.1 km || 
|-id=618 bgcolor=#E9E9E9
| 246618 ||  || — || November 17, 2008 || Kitt Peak || Spacewatch || — || align=right | 2.4 km || 
|-id=619 bgcolor=#E9E9E9
| 246619 ||  || — || November 17, 2008 || Kitt Peak || Spacewatch || — || align=right | 1.6 km || 
|-id=620 bgcolor=#E9E9E9
| 246620 ||  || — || November 19, 2008 || Mount Lemmon || Mount Lemmon Survey || HEN || align=right | 1.3 km || 
|-id=621 bgcolor=#E9E9E9
| 246621 ||  || — || November 17, 2008 || Kitt Peak || Spacewatch || — || align=right | 1.5 km || 
|-id=622 bgcolor=#d6d6d6
| 246622 ||  || — || November 18, 2008 || Socorro || LINEAR || — || align=right | 3.9 km || 
|-id=623 bgcolor=#E9E9E9
| 246623 ||  || — || November 17, 2008 || Kitt Peak || Spacewatch || — || align=right | 3.1 km || 
|-id=624 bgcolor=#d6d6d6
| 246624 ||  || — || November 20, 2008 || Kitt Peak || Spacewatch || — || align=right | 4.4 km || 
|-id=625 bgcolor=#fefefe
| 246625 ||  || — || November 21, 2008 || Kitt Peak || Spacewatch || — || align=right data-sort-value="0.92" | 920 m || 
|-id=626 bgcolor=#fefefe
| 246626 ||  || — || November 21, 2008 || Mount Lemmon || Mount Lemmon Survey || — || align=right data-sort-value="0.89" | 890 m || 
|-id=627 bgcolor=#E9E9E9
| 246627 ||  || — || November 21, 2008 || Mount Lemmon || Mount Lemmon Survey || GEF || align=right | 1.7 km || 
|-id=628 bgcolor=#E9E9E9
| 246628 ||  || — || November 23, 2008 || Mount Lemmon || Mount Lemmon Survey || — || align=right | 1.6 km || 
|-id=629 bgcolor=#E9E9E9
| 246629 ||  || — || November 28, 2008 || Pla D'Arguines || R. Ferrando || — || align=right | 1.7 km || 
|-id=630 bgcolor=#d6d6d6
| 246630 ||  || — || November 24, 2008 || Sierra Stars || F. Tozzi || — || align=right | 4.9 km || 
|-id=631 bgcolor=#d6d6d6
| 246631 ||  || — || November 30, 2008 || Kitt Peak || Spacewatch || — || align=right | 3.8 km || 
|-id=632 bgcolor=#E9E9E9
| 246632 ||  || — || November 20, 2008 || Mount Lemmon || Mount Lemmon Survey || — || align=right | 2.1 km || 
|-id=633 bgcolor=#E9E9E9
| 246633 ||  || — || November 20, 2008 || Kitt Peak || Spacewatch || — || align=right | 1.1 km || 
|-id=634 bgcolor=#fefefe
| 246634 ||  || — || December 2, 2008 || Marly || P. Kocher || — || align=right | 1.1 km || 
|-id=635 bgcolor=#d6d6d6
| 246635 ||  || — || December 1, 2008 || Catalina || CSS || — || align=right | 3.9 km || 
|-id=636 bgcolor=#fefefe
| 246636 ||  || — || December 1, 2008 || Kitt Peak || Spacewatch || FLO || align=right data-sort-value="0.97" | 970 m || 
|-id=637 bgcolor=#fefefe
| 246637 ||  || — || December 1, 2008 || Catalina || CSS || — || align=right | 1.3 km || 
|-id=638 bgcolor=#E9E9E9
| 246638 ||  || — || December 2, 2008 || Kitt Peak || Spacewatch || — || align=right | 1.7 km || 
|-id=639 bgcolor=#E9E9E9
| 246639 ||  || — || December 20, 2008 || La Sagra || OAM Obs. || — || align=right | 3.6 km || 
|-id=640 bgcolor=#fefefe
| 246640 ||  || — || December 22, 2008 || Dauban || F. Kugel || — || align=right | 1.1 km || 
|-id=641 bgcolor=#d6d6d6
| 246641 ||  || — || December 22, 2008 || Sandlot || G. Hug || — || align=right | 3.9 km || 
|-id=642 bgcolor=#E9E9E9
| 246642 ||  || — || December 23, 2008 || Piszkéstető || K. Sárneczky || MAR || align=right | 1.5 km || 
|-id=643 bgcolor=#E9E9E9
| 246643 Miaoli ||  ||  || December 18, 2008 || Lulin Observatory || X. Y. Hsiao, Q.-z. Ye || — || align=right | 3.8 km || 
|-id=644 bgcolor=#E9E9E9
| 246644 ||  || — || December 21, 2008 || Mount Lemmon || Mount Lemmon Survey || AST || align=right | 2.9 km || 
|-id=645 bgcolor=#d6d6d6
| 246645 ||  || — || December 21, 2008 || Mount Lemmon || Mount Lemmon Survey || — || align=right | 3.1 km || 
|-id=646 bgcolor=#fefefe
| 246646 ||  || — || December 21, 2008 || Mount Lemmon || Mount Lemmon Survey || — || align=right data-sort-value="0.87" | 870 m || 
|-id=647 bgcolor=#d6d6d6
| 246647 ||  || — || December 21, 2008 || Mount Lemmon || Mount Lemmon Survey || HYG || align=right | 3.2 km || 
|-id=648 bgcolor=#E9E9E9
| 246648 ||  || — || December 21, 2008 || Mount Lemmon || Mount Lemmon Survey || — || align=right | 1.2 km || 
|-id=649 bgcolor=#fefefe
| 246649 ||  || — || December 21, 2008 || Mount Lemmon || Mount Lemmon Survey || — || align=right | 2.1 km || 
|-id=650 bgcolor=#d6d6d6
| 246650 ||  || — || December 21, 2008 || Mount Lemmon || Mount Lemmon Survey || — || align=right | 3.7 km || 
|-id=651 bgcolor=#d6d6d6
| 246651 ||  || — || December 21, 2008 || Mount Lemmon || Mount Lemmon Survey || — || align=right | 3.1 km || 
|-id=652 bgcolor=#d6d6d6
| 246652 ||  || — || December 29, 2008 || Piszkéstető || K. Sárneczky || KOR || align=right | 1.5 km || 
|-id=653 bgcolor=#E9E9E9
| 246653 ||  || — || December 28, 2008 || Dauban || F. Kugel || — || align=right | 1.8 km || 
|-id=654 bgcolor=#fefefe
| 246654 ||  || — || December 22, 2008 || Kitt Peak || Spacewatch || — || align=right | 1.3 km || 
|-id=655 bgcolor=#E9E9E9
| 246655 ||  || — || December 29, 2008 || Kitt Peak || Spacewatch || — || align=right | 1.6 km || 
|-id=656 bgcolor=#d6d6d6
| 246656 ||  || — || December 30, 2008 || Mount Lemmon || Mount Lemmon Survey || URS || align=right | 6.0 km || 
|-id=657 bgcolor=#E9E9E9
| 246657 ||  || — || December 29, 2008 || Mount Lemmon || Mount Lemmon Survey || — || align=right | 1.8 km || 
|-id=658 bgcolor=#d6d6d6
| 246658 ||  || — || December 29, 2008 || Kitt Peak || Spacewatch || — || align=right | 3.0 km || 
|-id=659 bgcolor=#d6d6d6
| 246659 ||  || — || December 29, 2008 || Mount Lemmon || Mount Lemmon Survey || — || align=right | 2.7 km || 
|-id=660 bgcolor=#E9E9E9
| 246660 ||  || — || December 30, 2008 || Kitt Peak || Spacewatch || — || align=right | 3.2 km || 
|-id=661 bgcolor=#E9E9E9
| 246661 ||  || — || December 27, 2008 || Bergisch Gladbac || W. Bickel || HOF || align=right | 2.9 km || 
|-id=662 bgcolor=#d6d6d6
| 246662 ||  || — || December 29, 2008 || Kitt Peak || Spacewatch || — || align=right | 4.3 km || 
|-id=663 bgcolor=#fefefe
| 246663 ||  || — || December 29, 2008 || Kitt Peak || Spacewatch || — || align=right | 1.2 km || 
|-id=664 bgcolor=#d6d6d6
| 246664 ||  || — || December 29, 2008 || Kitt Peak || Spacewatch || CHA || align=right | 4.2 km || 
|-id=665 bgcolor=#fefefe
| 246665 ||  || — || December 29, 2008 || Kitt Peak || Spacewatch || — || align=right | 1.5 km || 
|-id=666 bgcolor=#d6d6d6
| 246666 ||  || — || December 29, 2008 || Kitt Peak || Spacewatch || VER || align=right | 3.0 km || 
|-id=667 bgcolor=#E9E9E9
| 246667 ||  || — || December 29, 2008 || Kitt Peak || Spacewatch || HOF || align=right | 3.2 km || 
|-id=668 bgcolor=#E9E9E9
| 246668 ||  || — || December 29, 2008 || Kitt Peak || Spacewatch || — || align=right | 1.4 km || 
|-id=669 bgcolor=#E9E9E9
| 246669 ||  || — || December 30, 2008 || Kitt Peak || Spacewatch || AST || align=right | 3.0 km || 
|-id=670 bgcolor=#E9E9E9
| 246670 ||  || — || December 31, 2008 || Kitt Peak || Spacewatch || — || align=right | 3.6 km || 
|-id=671 bgcolor=#E9E9E9
| 246671 ||  || — || December 31, 2008 || Kitt Peak || Spacewatch || — || align=right | 1.9 km || 
|-id=672 bgcolor=#d6d6d6
| 246672 ||  || — || December 31, 2008 || Kitt Peak || Spacewatch || CHA || align=right | 3.3 km || 
|-id=673 bgcolor=#d6d6d6
| 246673 ||  || — || December 30, 2008 || Kitt Peak || Spacewatch || EOS || align=right | 4.0 km || 
|-id=674 bgcolor=#fefefe
| 246674 ||  || — || December 30, 2008 || Mount Lemmon || Mount Lemmon Survey || — || align=right | 1.3 km || 
|-id=675 bgcolor=#E9E9E9
| 246675 ||  || — || December 30, 2008 || Mount Lemmon || Mount Lemmon Survey || — || align=right | 1.9 km || 
|-id=676 bgcolor=#d6d6d6
| 246676 ||  || — || December 22, 2008 || Kitt Peak || Spacewatch || ALA || align=right | 5.6 km || 
|-id=677 bgcolor=#d6d6d6
| 246677 ||  || — || December 22, 2008 || Mount Lemmon || Mount Lemmon Survey || KAR || align=right | 1.4 km || 
|-id=678 bgcolor=#E9E9E9
| 246678 ||  || — || December 30, 2008 || Mount Lemmon || Mount Lemmon Survey || — || align=right | 1.4 km || 
|-id=679 bgcolor=#E9E9E9
| 246679 ||  || — || December 31, 2008 || Mount Lemmon || Mount Lemmon Survey || HOF || align=right | 3.6 km || 
|-id=680 bgcolor=#E9E9E9
| 246680 ||  || — || December 31, 2008 || Mount Lemmon || Mount Lemmon Survey || HNS || align=right | 1.4 km || 
|-id=681 bgcolor=#fefefe
| 246681 ||  || — || December 29, 2008 || Mount Lemmon || Mount Lemmon Survey || — || align=right | 2.3 km || 
|-id=682 bgcolor=#E9E9E9
| 246682 ||  || — || December 21, 2008 || Kitt Peak || Spacewatch || — || align=right | 5.5 km || 
|-id=683 bgcolor=#d6d6d6
| 246683 ||  || — || December 31, 2008 || Catalina || CSS || ARM || align=right | 4.4 km || 
|-id=684 bgcolor=#d6d6d6
| 246684 ||  || — || December 21, 2008 || Mount Lemmon || Mount Lemmon Survey || — || align=right | 2.5 km || 
|-id=685 bgcolor=#d6d6d6
| 246685 ||  || — || December 22, 2008 || Kitt Peak || Spacewatch || — || align=right | 3.2 km || 
|-id=686 bgcolor=#fefefe
| 246686 ||  || — || December 29, 2008 || Kitt Peak || Spacewatch || MAS || align=right data-sort-value="0.99" | 990 m || 
|-id=687 bgcolor=#fefefe
| 246687 ||  || — || January 1, 2009 || Mayhill || A. Lowe || MAS || align=right | 1.1 km || 
|-id=688 bgcolor=#fefefe
| 246688 ||  || — || January 1, 2009 || Mayhill || A. Lowe || — || align=right | 1.3 km || 
|-id=689 bgcolor=#E9E9E9
| 246689 ||  || — || January 1, 2009 || Kitt Peak || Spacewatch || — || align=right | 3.3 km || 
|-id=690 bgcolor=#fefefe
| 246690 ||  || — || January 2, 2009 || Mount Lemmon || Mount Lemmon Survey || MAS || align=right data-sort-value="0.94" | 940 m || 
|-id=691 bgcolor=#d6d6d6
| 246691 ||  || — || January 2, 2009 || Mount Lemmon || Mount Lemmon Survey || KOR || align=right | 1.5 km || 
|-id=692 bgcolor=#d6d6d6
| 246692 ||  || — || January 3, 2009 || Kitt Peak || Spacewatch || — || align=right | 3.2 km || 
|-id=693 bgcolor=#E9E9E9
| 246693 ||  || — || January 3, 2009 || Kitt Peak || Spacewatch || — || align=right | 1.6 km || 
|-id=694 bgcolor=#E9E9E9
| 246694 ||  || — || January 3, 2009 || Kitt Peak || Spacewatch || — || align=right | 2.8 km || 
|-id=695 bgcolor=#E9E9E9
| 246695 ||  || — || January 2, 2009 || Kitt Peak || Spacewatch || MRX || align=right | 1.1 km || 
|-id=696 bgcolor=#d6d6d6
| 246696 ||  || — || January 2, 2009 || Kitt Peak || Spacewatch || — || align=right | 2.7 km || 
|-id=697 bgcolor=#fefefe
| 246697 ||  || — || January 2, 2009 || Kitt Peak || Spacewatch || MAS || align=right data-sort-value="0.95" | 950 m || 
|-id=698 bgcolor=#d6d6d6
| 246698 ||  || — || January 2, 2009 || Kitt Peak || Spacewatch || — || align=right | 6.0 km || 
|-id=699 bgcolor=#d6d6d6
| 246699 ||  || — || January 15, 2009 || Kitt Peak || Spacewatch || — || align=right | 5.8 km || 
|-id=700 bgcolor=#d6d6d6
| 246700 ||  || — || January 15, 2009 || Kitt Peak || Spacewatch || — || align=right | 3.1 km || 
|}

246701–246800 

|-bgcolor=#fefefe
| 246701 ||  || — || January 15, 2009 || Kitt Peak || Spacewatch || V || align=right data-sort-value="0.70" | 700 m || 
|-id=702 bgcolor=#d6d6d6
| 246702 ||  || — || January 15, 2009 || Kitt Peak || Spacewatch || EUP || align=right | 3.8 km || 
|-id=703 bgcolor=#E9E9E9
| 246703 ||  || — || January 15, 2009 || Kitt Peak || Spacewatch || HEN || align=right | 1.4 km || 
|-id=704 bgcolor=#d6d6d6
| 246704 ||  || — || January 15, 2009 || Kitt Peak || Spacewatch || HYG || align=right | 4.7 km || 
|-id=705 bgcolor=#E9E9E9
| 246705 ||  || — || January 15, 2009 || Kitt Peak || Spacewatch || — || align=right | 3.1 km || 
|-id=706 bgcolor=#d6d6d6
| 246706 ||  || — || January 3, 2009 || Mount Lemmon || Mount Lemmon Survey || LIX || align=right | 5.2 km || 
|-id=707 bgcolor=#fefefe
| 246707 ||  || — || January 18, 2009 || Socorro || LINEAR || — || align=right | 1.2 km || 
|-id=708 bgcolor=#d6d6d6
| 246708 ||  || — || January 18, 2009 || Socorro || LINEAR || — || align=right | 4.5 km || 
|-id=709 bgcolor=#fefefe
| 246709 ||  || — || January 18, 2009 || Socorro || LINEAR || — || align=right | 3.3 km || 
|-id=710 bgcolor=#E9E9E9
| 246710 ||  || — || January 18, 2009 || Socorro || LINEAR || GEF || align=right | 1.8 km || 
|-id=711 bgcolor=#d6d6d6
| 246711 ||  || — || January 17, 2009 || Socorro || LINEAR || — || align=right | 4.7 km || 
|-id=712 bgcolor=#E9E9E9
| 246712 ||  || — || January 25, 2009 || Mayhill || A. Lowe || — || align=right | 2.8 km || 
|-id=713 bgcolor=#E9E9E9
| 246713 ||  || — || January 21, 2009 || Socorro || LINEAR || — || align=right | 1.5 km || 
|-id=714 bgcolor=#fefefe
| 246714 ||  || — || January 21, 2009 || Socorro || LINEAR || V || align=right | 1.00 km || 
|-id=715 bgcolor=#fefefe
| 246715 ||  || — || January 16, 2009 || Kitt Peak || Spacewatch || V || align=right data-sort-value="0.83" | 830 m || 
|-id=716 bgcolor=#d6d6d6
| 246716 ||  || — || January 16, 2009 || Kitt Peak || Spacewatch || HYG || align=right | 3.5 km || 
|-id=717 bgcolor=#d6d6d6
| 246717 ||  || — || January 17, 2009 || Mount Lemmon || Mount Lemmon Survey || — || align=right | 3.9 km || 
|-id=718 bgcolor=#d6d6d6
| 246718 ||  || — || January 16, 2009 || Mount Lemmon || Mount Lemmon Survey || HYG || align=right | 3.2 km || 
|-id=719 bgcolor=#fefefe
| 246719 ||  || — || January 16, 2009 || Mount Lemmon || Mount Lemmon Survey || — || align=right data-sort-value="0.86" | 860 m || 
|-id=720 bgcolor=#d6d6d6
| 246720 ||  || — || January 16, 2009 || Mount Lemmon || Mount Lemmon Survey || 628 || align=right | 2.8 km || 
|-id=721 bgcolor=#d6d6d6
| 246721 ||  || — || January 17, 2009 || Catalina || CSS || NAE || align=right | 4.1 km || 
|-id=722 bgcolor=#d6d6d6
| 246722 ||  || — || January 16, 2009 || Kitt Peak || Spacewatch || — || align=right | 5.7 km || 
|-id=723 bgcolor=#d6d6d6
| 246723 ||  || — || January 16, 2009 || Kitt Peak || Spacewatch || EOS || align=right | 2.7 km || 
|-id=724 bgcolor=#d6d6d6
| 246724 ||  || — || January 16, 2009 || Kitt Peak || Spacewatch || — || align=right | 5.1 km || 
|-id=725 bgcolor=#d6d6d6
| 246725 ||  || — || January 16, 2009 || Kitt Peak || Spacewatch || — || align=right | 3.6 km || 
|-id=726 bgcolor=#d6d6d6
| 246726 ||  || — || January 16, 2009 || Kitt Peak || Spacewatch || 3:2 || align=right | 8.1 km || 
|-id=727 bgcolor=#E9E9E9
| 246727 ||  || — || January 16, 2009 || Mount Lemmon || Mount Lemmon Survey || — || align=right | 2.2 km || 
|-id=728 bgcolor=#E9E9E9
| 246728 ||  || — || January 16, 2009 || Kitt Peak || Spacewatch || — || align=right | 2.8 km || 
|-id=729 bgcolor=#E9E9E9
| 246729 ||  || — || January 17, 2009 || Kitt Peak || Spacewatch || — || align=right | 2.4 km || 
|-id=730 bgcolor=#E9E9E9
| 246730 ||  || — || January 18, 2009 || Kitt Peak || Spacewatch || — || align=right | 1.3 km || 
|-id=731 bgcolor=#d6d6d6
| 246731 ||  || — || January 18, 2009 || Kitt Peak || Spacewatch || — || align=right | 4.1 km || 
|-id=732 bgcolor=#fefefe
| 246732 ||  || — || January 18, 2009 || Kitt Peak || Spacewatch || — || align=right | 1.1 km || 
|-id=733 bgcolor=#d6d6d6
| 246733 ||  || — || January 18, 2009 || Purple Mountain || PMO NEO || — || align=right | 5.5 km || 
|-id=734 bgcolor=#E9E9E9
| 246734 ||  || — || January 20, 2009 || Kitt Peak || Spacewatch || — || align=right | 2.0 km || 
|-id=735 bgcolor=#E9E9E9
| 246735 ||  || — || January 20, 2009 || Kitt Peak || Spacewatch || — || align=right | 1.5 km || 
|-id=736 bgcolor=#E9E9E9
| 246736 ||  || — || January 20, 2009 || Mount Lemmon || Mount Lemmon Survey || JUN || align=right | 1.7 km || 
|-id=737 bgcolor=#E9E9E9
| 246737 ||  || — || January 20, 2009 || Kitt Peak || Spacewatch || HEN || align=right | 1.3 km || 
|-id=738 bgcolor=#d6d6d6
| 246738 ||  || — || January 25, 2009 || Catalina || CSS || THM || align=right | 2.6 km || 
|-id=739 bgcolor=#E9E9E9
| 246739 ||  || — || January 17, 2009 || Kitt Peak || Spacewatch || WIT || align=right | 1.3 km || 
|-id=740 bgcolor=#d6d6d6
| 246740 ||  || — || January 25, 2009 || Catalina || CSS || — || align=right | 5.1 km || 
|-id=741 bgcolor=#E9E9E9
| 246741 ||  || — || January 29, 2009 || Pla D'Arguines || R. Ferrando || HEN || align=right | 1.5 km || 
|-id=742 bgcolor=#fefefe
| 246742 ||  || — || January 30, 2009 || Socorro || LINEAR || PHO || align=right | 1.7 km || 
|-id=743 bgcolor=#E9E9E9
| 246743 ||  || — || January 30, 2009 || Socorro || LINEAR || AEO || align=right | 1.5 km || 
|-id=744 bgcolor=#E9E9E9
| 246744 ||  || — || January 20, 2009 || Catalina || CSS || — || align=right | 2.6 km || 
|-id=745 bgcolor=#d6d6d6
| 246745 ||  || — || January 20, 2009 || Catalina || CSS || LIX || align=right | 4.8 km || 
|-id=746 bgcolor=#E9E9E9
| 246746 ||  || — || January 26, 2009 || Mount Lemmon || Mount Lemmon Survey || — || align=right | 2.8 km || 
|-id=747 bgcolor=#d6d6d6
| 246747 ||  || — || January 29, 2009 || Kitt Peak || Spacewatch || Tj (2.98) || align=right | 3.3 km || 
|-id=748 bgcolor=#E9E9E9
| 246748 ||  || — || January 31, 2009 || Kitt Peak || Spacewatch || — || align=right | 2.3 km || 
|-id=749 bgcolor=#d6d6d6
| 246749 ||  || — || January 29, 2009 || Mount Lemmon || Mount Lemmon Survey || ALA || align=right | 5.3 km || 
|-id=750 bgcolor=#E9E9E9
| 246750 ||  || — || January 29, 2009 || Kitt Peak || Spacewatch || HEN || align=right | 1.1 km || 
|-id=751 bgcolor=#fefefe
| 246751 ||  || — || January 29, 2009 || Kitt Peak || Spacewatch || — || align=right | 1.1 km || 
|-id=752 bgcolor=#d6d6d6
| 246752 ||  || — || January 30, 2009 || Kitt Peak || Spacewatch || — || align=right | 4.1 km || 
|-id=753 bgcolor=#fefefe
| 246753 ||  || — || January 31, 2009 || Kitt Peak || Spacewatch || — || align=right data-sort-value="0.98" | 980 m || 
|-id=754 bgcolor=#d6d6d6
| 246754 ||  || — || January 30, 2009 || Kitt Peak || Spacewatch || — || align=right | 3.4 km || 
|-id=755 bgcolor=#E9E9E9
| 246755 ||  || — || January 31, 2009 || Kitt Peak || Spacewatch || — || align=right data-sort-value="0.97" | 970 m || 
|-id=756 bgcolor=#d6d6d6
| 246756 ||  || — || January 31, 2009 || Mount Lemmon || Mount Lemmon Survey || VER || align=right | 2.9 km || 
|-id=757 bgcolor=#d6d6d6
| 246757 ||  || — || January 29, 2009 || Catalina || CSS || EUP || align=right | 7.3 km || 
|-id=758 bgcolor=#d6d6d6
| 246758 ||  || — || January 25, 2009 || Catalina || CSS || EOS || align=right | 2.7 km || 
|-id=759 bgcolor=#fefefe
| 246759 Elviracheca ||  ||  || February 11, 2009 || Calar Alto || F. Hormuth || — || align=right | 1.1 km || 
|-id=760 bgcolor=#E9E9E9
| 246760 ||  || — || February 1, 2009 || Kitt Peak || Spacewatch || AGN || align=right | 1.4 km || 
|-id=761 bgcolor=#E9E9E9
| 246761 ||  || — || February 1, 2009 || Kitt Peak || Spacewatch || WIT || align=right | 1.4 km || 
|-id=762 bgcolor=#d6d6d6
| 246762 ||  || — || February 2, 2009 || Kitt Peak || Spacewatch || EOS || align=right | 4.1 km || 
|-id=763 bgcolor=#d6d6d6
| 246763 ||  || — || February 1, 2009 || Kitt Peak || Spacewatch || — || align=right | 3.3 km || 
|-id=764 bgcolor=#d6d6d6
| 246764 ||  || — || February 1, 2009 || Mount Lemmon || Mount Lemmon Survey || — || align=right | 4.9 km || 
|-id=765 bgcolor=#d6d6d6
| 246765 ||  || — || February 1, 2009 || Kitt Peak || Spacewatch || — || align=right | 3.2 km || 
|-id=766 bgcolor=#fefefe
| 246766 ||  || — || February 1, 2009 || Kitt Peak || Spacewatch || — || align=right data-sort-value="0.98" | 980 m || 
|-id=767 bgcolor=#E9E9E9
| 246767 ||  || — || February 1, 2009 || Kitt Peak || Spacewatch || — || align=right | 1.5 km || 
|-id=768 bgcolor=#E9E9E9
| 246768 ||  || — || February 1, 2009 || Kitt Peak || Spacewatch || — || align=right | 1.4 km || 
|-id=769 bgcolor=#d6d6d6
| 246769 ||  || — || February 2, 2009 || Mount Lemmon || Mount Lemmon Survey || — || align=right | 5.4 km || 
|-id=770 bgcolor=#fefefe
| 246770 ||  || — || February 14, 2009 || Kitt Peak || Spacewatch || V || align=right data-sort-value="0.82" | 820 m || 
|-id=771 bgcolor=#d6d6d6
| 246771 ||  || — || February 14, 2009 || Mount Lemmon || Mount Lemmon Survey || — || align=right | 4.4 km || 
|-id=772 bgcolor=#d6d6d6
| 246772 ||  || — || February 14, 2009 || La Sagra || OAM Obs. || HYG || align=right | 3.2 km || 
|-id=773 bgcolor=#fefefe
| 246773 ||  || — || February 14, 2009 || La Sagra || OAM Obs. || — || align=right | 1.4 km || 
|-id=774 bgcolor=#d6d6d6
| 246774 ||  || — || February 1, 2009 || Mount Lemmon || Mount Lemmon Survey || HYG || align=right | 4.3 km || 
|-id=775 bgcolor=#E9E9E9
| 246775 ||  || — || February 17, 2009 || Kitt Peak || Spacewatch || — || align=right | 2.7 km || 
|-id=776 bgcolor=#d6d6d6
| 246776 ||  || — || February 19, 2009 || Dauban || F. Kugel || EOS || align=right | 2.6 km || 
|-id=777 bgcolor=#E9E9E9
| 246777 ||  || — || February 17, 2009 || La Sagra || OAM Obs. || NEM || align=right | 3.3 km || 
|-id=778 bgcolor=#d6d6d6
| 246778 ||  || — || February 17, 2009 || La Sagra || OAM Obs. || ULA7:4 || align=right | 5.7 km || 
|-id=779 bgcolor=#d6d6d6
| 246779 ||  || — || February 16, 2009 || Catalina || CSS || — || align=right | 3.9 km || 
|-id=780 bgcolor=#d6d6d6
| 246780 ||  || — || February 25, 2009 || Dauban || F. Kugel || — || align=right | 3.9 km || 
|-id=781 bgcolor=#fefefe
| 246781 ||  || — || February 19, 2009 || Kitt Peak || Spacewatch || — || align=right | 2.0 km || 
|-id=782 bgcolor=#d6d6d6
| 246782 ||  || — || February 22, 2009 || Kitt Peak || Spacewatch || 7:4 || align=right | 4.5 km || 
|-id=783 bgcolor=#d6d6d6
| 246783 ||  || — || February 22, 2009 || Kitt Peak || Spacewatch || NAE || align=right | 2.9 km || 
|-id=784 bgcolor=#d6d6d6
| 246784 ||  || — || February 22, 2009 || Kitt Peak || Spacewatch || — || align=right | 3.5 km || 
|-id=785 bgcolor=#E9E9E9
| 246785 ||  || — || February 26, 2009 || Catalina || CSS || — || align=right | 1.9 km || 
|-id=786 bgcolor=#d6d6d6
| 246786 ||  || — || February 24, 2009 || La Sagra || OAM Obs. || 3:2 || align=right | 6.0 km || 
|-id=787 bgcolor=#E9E9E9
| 246787 ||  || — || February 24, 2009 || Kitt Peak || Spacewatch || — || align=right | 2.1 km || 
|-id=788 bgcolor=#d6d6d6
| 246788 ||  || — || February 27, 2009 || Kitt Peak || Spacewatch || — || align=right | 4.4 km || 
|-id=789 bgcolor=#fefefe
| 246789 Pattinson ||  ||  || February 24, 2009 || Zelenchukskaya || T. V. Kryachko || — || align=right | 1.3 km || 
|-id=790 bgcolor=#d6d6d6
| 246790 ||  || — || February 26, 2009 || Catalina || CSS || — || align=right | 2.8 km || 
|-id=791 bgcolor=#E9E9E9
| 246791 ||  || — || February 26, 2009 || Kitt Peak || Spacewatch || — || align=right | 2.6 km || 
|-id=792 bgcolor=#d6d6d6
| 246792 ||  || — || February 27, 2009 || Catalina || CSS || — || align=right | 3.6 km || 
|-id=793 bgcolor=#fefefe
| 246793 ||  || — || February 19, 2009 || Catalina || CSS || ERI || align=right | 2.1 km || 
|-id=794 bgcolor=#d6d6d6
| 246794 ||  || — || February 24, 2009 || Catalina || CSS || — || align=right | 4.0 km || 
|-id=795 bgcolor=#d6d6d6
| 246795 ||  || — || March 15, 2009 || La Sagra || OAM Obs. || — || align=right | 3.8 km || 
|-id=796 bgcolor=#E9E9E9
| 246796 ||  || — || March 2, 2009 || Mount Lemmon || Mount Lemmon Survey || AGN || align=right | 1.6 km || 
|-id=797 bgcolor=#E9E9E9
| 246797 ||  || — || March 1, 2009 || Kitt Peak || Spacewatch || — || align=right | 1.6 km || 
|-id=798 bgcolor=#d6d6d6
| 246798 ||  || — || March 2, 2009 || Kitt Peak || Spacewatch || — || align=right | 5.9 km || 
|-id=799 bgcolor=#d6d6d6
| 246799 ||  || — || March 15, 2009 || Kitt Peak || Spacewatch || — || align=right | 3.5 km || 
|-id=800 bgcolor=#E9E9E9
| 246800 ||  || — || March 15, 2009 || Kitt Peak || Spacewatch || — || align=right | 2.4 km || 
|}

246801–246900 

|-bgcolor=#d6d6d6
| 246801 ||  || — || March 3, 2009 || Kitt Peak || Spacewatch || — || align=right | 4.4 km || 
|-id=802 bgcolor=#fefefe
| 246802 ||  || — || March 15, 2009 || Kitt Peak || Spacewatch || — || align=right | 1.4 km || 
|-id=803 bgcolor=#d6d6d6
| 246803 ||  || — || March 17, 2009 || Vicques || M. Ory || ALA || align=right | 7.4 km || 
|-id=804 bgcolor=#E9E9E9
| 246804 ||  || — || March 16, 2009 || Kitt Peak || Spacewatch || — || align=right | 2.1 km || 
|-id=805 bgcolor=#d6d6d6
| 246805 ||  || — || March 16, 2009 || Mount Lemmon || Mount Lemmon Survey || VER || align=right | 3.1 km || 
|-id=806 bgcolor=#d6d6d6
| 246806 ||  || — || March 18, 2009 || Mount Lemmon || Mount Lemmon Survey || — || align=right | 5.1 km || 
|-id=807 bgcolor=#E9E9E9
| 246807 ||  || — || March 24, 2009 || La Sagra || OAM Obs. || — || align=right | 2.5 km || 
|-id=808 bgcolor=#d6d6d6
| 246808 ||  || — || March 29, 2009 || Bergisch Gladbach || W. Bickel || — || align=right | 3.6 km || 
|-id=809 bgcolor=#E9E9E9
| 246809 ||  || — || March 21, 2009 || Mount Lemmon || Mount Lemmon Survey || — || align=right | 1.7 km || 
|-id=810 bgcolor=#E9E9E9
| 246810 ||  || — || March 23, 2009 || Calar Alto || F. Hormuth || MIS || align=right | 2.7 km || 
|-id=811 bgcolor=#d6d6d6
| 246811 ||  || — || April 15, 2009 || Siding Spring || SSS || TIR || align=right | 3.0 km || 
|-id=812 bgcolor=#d6d6d6
| 246812 ||  || — || April 24, 2009 || Kitt Peak || Spacewatch || EOS || align=right | 2.6 km || 
|-id=813 bgcolor=#fefefe
| 246813 ||  || — || April 24, 2009 || Mount Lemmon || Mount Lemmon Survey || — || align=right | 1.9 km || 
|-id=814 bgcolor=#d6d6d6
| 246814 ||  || — || April 28, 2009 || Catalina || CSS || HYG || align=right | 4.1 km || 
|-id=815 bgcolor=#E9E9E9
| 246815 ||  || — || April 26, 2009 || Socorro || LINEAR || EUN || align=right | 2.5 km || 
|-id=816 bgcolor=#d6d6d6
| 246816 ||  || — || April 23, 2009 || La Sagra || OAM Obs. || EOS || align=right | 2.6 km || 
|-id=817 bgcolor=#C2FFFF
| 246817 ||  || — || May 17, 2009 || La Sagra || OAM Obs. || L5ENM || align=right | 15 km || 
|-id=818 bgcolor=#E9E9E9
| 246818 ||  || — || May 17, 2009 || La Sagra || OAM Obs. || — || align=right | 2.5 km || 
|-id=819 bgcolor=#d6d6d6
| 246819 ||  || — || June 14, 2009 || Mount Lemmon || Mount Lemmon Survey || ARM || align=right | 5.1 km || 
|-id=820 bgcolor=#d6d6d6
| 246820 || 2009 MP || — || June 17, 2009 || Mayhill || A. Lowe || — || align=right | 5.9 km || 
|-id=821 bgcolor=#d6d6d6
| 246821 Satyarthi ||  ||  || August 27, 2009 || Vallemare di Borbona || V. S. Casulli || HYG || align=right | 3.6 km || 
|-id=822 bgcolor=#fefefe
| 246822 ||  || — || September 17, 2009 || Catalina || CSS || V || align=right data-sort-value="0.82" | 820 m || 
|-id=823 bgcolor=#d6d6d6
| 246823 ||  || — || October 14, 2009 || La Sagra || OAM Obs. || EOS || align=right | 3.9 km || 
|-id=824 bgcolor=#d6d6d6
| 246824 ||  || — || October 15, 2009 || La Sagra || OAM Obs. || — || align=right | 4.9 km || 
|-id=825 bgcolor=#d6d6d6
| 246825 ||  || — || October 14, 2009 || Mount Lemmon || Mount Lemmon Survey || — || align=right | 6.2 km || 
|-id=826 bgcolor=#E9E9E9
| 246826 ||  || — || October 12, 2009 || Mount Lemmon || Mount Lemmon Survey || — || align=right | 3.4 km || 
|-id=827 bgcolor=#E9E9E9
| 246827 ||  || — || October 12, 2009 || La Sagra || OAM Obs. || — || align=right | 2.5 km || 
|-id=828 bgcolor=#d6d6d6
| 246828 ||  || — || October 18, 2009 || Črni Vrh || Črni Vrh || — || align=right | 6.1 km || 
|-id=829 bgcolor=#d6d6d6
| 246829 ||  || — || October 22, 2009 || Mount Lemmon || Mount Lemmon Survey || THM || align=right | 3.2 km || 
|-id=830 bgcolor=#fefefe
| 246830 ||  || — || October 23, 2009 || Kitt Peak || Spacewatch || — || align=right | 1.4 km || 
|-id=831 bgcolor=#C2FFFF
| 246831 ||  || — || October 22, 2009 || Mount Lemmon || Mount Lemmon Survey || L4 || align=right | 12 km || 
|-id=832 bgcolor=#d6d6d6
| 246832 ||  || — || October 24, 2009 || Catalina || CSS || — || align=right | 4.4 km || 
|-id=833 bgcolor=#C2FFFF
| 246833 ||  || — || October 24, 2009 || Catalina || CSS || L4 || align=right | 14 km || 
|-id=834 bgcolor=#d6d6d6
| 246834 ||  || — || November 19, 2009 || Socorro || LINEAR || TIR || align=right | 4.2 km || 
|-id=835 bgcolor=#d6d6d6
| 246835 ||  || — || November 16, 2009 || Kitt Peak || Spacewatch || — || align=right | 3.6 km || 
|-id=836 bgcolor=#d6d6d6
| 246836 ||  || — || November 18, 2009 || Kitt Peak || Spacewatch || — || align=right | 3.3 km || 
|-id=837 bgcolor=#d6d6d6
| 246837 Bethfabinsky ||  ||  || February 13, 2010 || WISE || WISE || — || align=right | 5.3 km || 
|-id=838 bgcolor=#E9E9E9
| 246838 ||  || — || February 13, 2010 || Catalina || CSS || — || align=right | 2.1 km || 
|-id=839 bgcolor=#d6d6d6
| 246839 ||  || — || February 14, 2010 || Mount Lemmon || Mount Lemmon Survey || — || align=right | 3.5 km || 
|-id=840 bgcolor=#d6d6d6
| 246840 ||  || — || February 17, 2010 || Kitt Peak || Spacewatch || SYL7:4 || align=right | 5.0 km || 
|-id=841 bgcolor=#E9E9E9
| 246841 Williamirace ||  ||  || February 24, 2010 || WISE || WISE || — || align=right | 2.2 km || 
|-id=842 bgcolor=#E9E9E9
| 246842 Dutchstapelbroek ||  ||  || March 2, 2010 || WISE || WISE || — || align=right | 3.7 km || 
|-id=843 bgcolor=#d6d6d6
| 246843 ||  || — || March 4, 2010 || Kitt Peak || Spacewatch || — || align=right | 2.7 km || 
|-id=844 bgcolor=#d6d6d6
| 246844 ||  || — || March 13, 2010 || Catalina || CSS || — || align=right | 4.0 km || 
|-id=845 bgcolor=#fefefe
| 246845 ||  || — || March 14, 2010 || Catalina || CSS || — || align=right | 2.3 km || 
|-id=846 bgcolor=#d6d6d6
| 246846 ||  || — || March 15, 2010 || Catalina || CSS || EOS || align=right | 5.5 km || 
|-id=847 bgcolor=#fefefe
| 246847 ||  || — || March 13, 2010 || Catalina || CSS || — || align=right | 1.3 km || 
|-id=848 bgcolor=#E9E9E9
| 246848 ||  || — || March 12, 2010 || Kitt Peak || Spacewatch || PAE || align=right | 3.0 km || 
|-id=849 bgcolor=#d6d6d6
| 246849 ||  || — || March 22, 2010 || ESA OGS || ESA OGS || THM || align=right | 3.5 km || 
|-id=850 bgcolor=#E9E9E9
| 246850 ||  || — || March 25, 2010 || Kitt Peak || Spacewatch || HOF || align=right | 3.8 km || 
|-id=851 bgcolor=#d6d6d6
| 246851 ||  || — || April 7, 2010 || La Sagra || OAM Obs. || NAE || align=right | 5.0 km || 
|-id=852 bgcolor=#E9E9E9
| 246852 ||  || — || April 5, 2010 || Mount Lemmon || Mount Lemmon Survey || AST || align=right | 3.6 km || 
|-id=853 bgcolor=#fefefe
| 246853 ||  || — || April 4, 2010 || Catalina || CSS || — || align=right | 1.5 km || 
|-id=854 bgcolor=#d6d6d6
| 246854 ||  || — || April 7, 2010 || Kitt Peak || Spacewatch || — || align=right | 3.1 km || 
|-id=855 bgcolor=#d6d6d6
| 246855 ||  || — || April 10, 2010 || Mount Lemmon || Mount Lemmon Survey || THM || align=right | 3.0 km || 
|-id=856 bgcolor=#E9E9E9
| 246856 ||  || — || April 10, 2010 || Mount Lemmon || Mount Lemmon Survey || HNA || align=right | 3.4 km || 
|-id=857 bgcolor=#fefefe
| 246857 ||  || — || April 20, 2010 || Kitt Peak || Spacewatch || — || align=right | 2.5 km || 
|-id=858 bgcolor=#E9E9E9
| 246858 ||  || — || April 25, 2010 || Nogales || Tenagra II Obs. || — || align=right | 3.1 km || 
|-id=859 bgcolor=#fefefe
| 246859 ||  || — || May 5, 2010 || Nogales || Tenagra II Obs. || — || align=right | 1.00 km || 
|-id=860 bgcolor=#E9E9E9
| 246860 ||  || — || May 9, 2010 || Mount Lemmon || Mount Lemmon Survey || — || align=right | 1.8 km || 
|-id=861 bgcolor=#E9E9E9
| 246861 Johnelwell ||  ||  || May 17, 2010 || WISE || WISE || — || align=right | 2.1 km || 
|-id=862 bgcolor=#d6d6d6
| 246862 || 2655 P-L || — || September 24, 1960 || Palomar || PLS || — || align=right | 6.5 km || 
|-id=863 bgcolor=#fefefe
| 246863 || 2697 P-L || — || September 24, 1960 || Palomar || PLS || NYS || align=right data-sort-value="0.85" | 850 m || 
|-id=864 bgcolor=#fefefe
| 246864 || 6379 P-L || — || September 24, 1960 || Palomar || PLS || NYS || align=right data-sort-value="0.91" | 910 m || 
|-id=865 bgcolor=#fefefe
| 246865 || 6770 P-L || — || September 24, 1960 || Palomar || PLS || — || align=right | 1.6 km || 
|-id=866 bgcolor=#d6d6d6
| 246866 || 1356 T-2 || — || September 29, 1973 || Palomar || PLS || — || align=right | 2.3 km || 
|-id=867 bgcolor=#fefefe
| 246867 || 2057 T-2 || — || September 29, 1973 || Palomar || PLS || NYS || align=right data-sort-value="0.99" | 990 m || 
|-id=868 bgcolor=#d6d6d6
| 246868 || 1366 T-3 || — || October 17, 1977 || Palomar || PLS || — || align=right | 5.4 km || 
|-id=869 bgcolor=#d6d6d6
| 246869 || 4583 T-3 || — || October 16, 1977 || Palomar || PLS || — || align=right | 3.4 km || 
|-id=870 bgcolor=#E9E9E9
| 246870 ||  || — || September 15, 1993 || La Silla || E. W. Elst || MIS || align=right | 1.9 km || 
|-id=871 bgcolor=#E9E9E9
| 246871 ||  || — || October 9, 1993 || La Silla || E. W. Elst || — || align=right | 2.2 km || 
|-id=872 bgcolor=#d6d6d6
| 246872 ||  || — || October 9, 1993 || La Silla || E. W. Elst || THB || align=right | 4.1 km || 
|-id=873 bgcolor=#d6d6d6
| 246873 ||  || — || August 10, 1994 || La Silla || E. W. Elst || — || align=right | 2.9 km || 
|-id=874 bgcolor=#d6d6d6
| 246874 ||  || — || October 28, 1994 || Kitt Peak || Spacewatch || — || align=right | 4.0 km || 
|-id=875 bgcolor=#d6d6d6
| 246875 ||  || — || November 28, 1994 || Kitt Peak || Spacewatch || — || align=right | 6.3 km || 
|-id=876 bgcolor=#d6d6d6
| 246876 ||  || — || December 1, 1994 || Kitt Peak || Spacewatch || — || align=right | 2.9 km || 
|-id=877 bgcolor=#fefefe
| 246877 ||  || — || February 24, 1995 || Siding Spring || R. H. McNaught || PHO || align=right | 1.6 km || 
|-id=878 bgcolor=#d6d6d6
| 246878 ||  || — || July 22, 1995 || Kitt Peak || Spacewatch || — || align=right | 3.3 km || 
|-id=879 bgcolor=#E9E9E9
| 246879 ||  || — || September 18, 1995 || Kitt Peak || Spacewatch || ADE || align=right | 3.4 km || 
|-id=880 bgcolor=#fefefe
| 246880 ||  || — || September 17, 1995 || Xinglong || SCAP || — || align=right | 1.1 km || 
|-id=881 bgcolor=#d6d6d6
| 246881 ||  || — || October 15, 1995 || Kitt Peak || Spacewatch || EOS || align=right | 3.2 km || 
|-id=882 bgcolor=#E9E9E9
| 246882 ||  || — || January 24, 1996 || Kitt Peak || Spacewatch || — || align=right | 3.2 km || 
|-id=883 bgcolor=#E9E9E9
| 246883 ||  || — || January 24, 1996 || Kitt Peak || Spacewatch || — || align=right | 2.3 km || 
|-id=884 bgcolor=#d6d6d6
| 246884 ||  || — || March 12, 1996 || Kitt Peak || Spacewatch || — || align=right | 5.9 km || 
|-id=885 bgcolor=#d6d6d6
| 246885 ||  || — || April 13, 1996 || Kitt Peak || Spacewatch || — || align=right | 4.4 km || 
|-id=886 bgcolor=#fefefe
| 246886 ||  || — || December 6, 1996 || Kitt Peak || Spacewatch || — || align=right | 2.9 km || 
|-id=887 bgcolor=#d6d6d6
| 246887 ||  || — || December 12, 1996 || Kitt Peak || Spacewatch || KOR || align=right | 1.8 km || 
|-id=888 bgcolor=#d6d6d6
| 246888 ||  || — || February 3, 1997 || Kitt Peak || Spacewatch || — || align=right | 6.1 km || 
|-id=889 bgcolor=#d6d6d6
| 246889 ||  || — || March 3, 1997 || Kitt Peak || Spacewatch || — || align=right | 4.1 km || 
|-id=890 bgcolor=#d6d6d6
| 246890 ||  || — || March 4, 1997 || Kitt Peak || Spacewatch || — || align=right | 6.0 km || 
|-id=891 bgcolor=#C2FFFF
| 246891 ||  || — || May 8, 1997 || Kitt Peak || Spacewatch || L5 || align=right | 10 km || 
|-id=892 bgcolor=#E9E9E9
| 246892 ||  || — || July 7, 1997 || Kitt Peak || Spacewatch || — || align=right | 3.2 km || 
|-id=893 bgcolor=#fefefe
| 246893 ||  || — || July 29, 1997 || San Marcello || A. Boattini, L. Tesi || FLO || align=right data-sort-value="0.81" | 810 m || 
|-id=894 bgcolor=#d6d6d6
| 246894 ||  || — || September 23, 1997 || Kitt Peak || Spacewatch || — || align=right | 2.9 km || 
|-id=895 bgcolor=#E9E9E9
| 246895 ||  || — || September 23, 1997 || Kitt Peak || Spacewatch || — || align=right | 2.8 km || 
|-id=896 bgcolor=#E9E9E9
| 246896 ||  || — || September 28, 1997 || Kitt Peak || Spacewatch || — || align=right | 3.3 km || 
|-id=897 bgcolor=#fefefe
| 246897 ||  || — || September 28, 1997 || Kitt Peak || Spacewatch || FLO || align=right data-sort-value="0.77" | 770 m || 
|-id=898 bgcolor=#E9E9E9
| 246898 ||  || — || September 27, 1997 || Kitt Peak || Spacewatch || EUN || align=right | 1.7 km || 
|-id=899 bgcolor=#E9E9E9
| 246899 ||  || — || October 1, 1997 || Caussols || ODAS || — || align=right | 4.3 km || 
|-id=900 bgcolor=#d6d6d6
| 246900 ||  || — || November 23, 1997 || Kitt Peak || Spacewatch || — || align=right | 4.3 km || 
|}

246901–247000 

|-bgcolor=#d6d6d6
| 246901 ||  || — || November 28, 1997 || Kitt Peak || Spacewatch || LIX || align=right | 6.6 km || 
|-id=902 bgcolor=#d6d6d6
| 246902 ||  || — || February 26, 1998 || Kitt Peak || Spacewatch || — || align=right | 4.9 km || 
|-id=903 bgcolor=#E9E9E9
| 246903 ||  || — || February 22, 1998 || Kitt Peak || Spacewatch || — || align=right | 4.3 km || 
|-id=904 bgcolor=#E9E9E9
| 246904 ||  || — || March 24, 1998 || Caussols || ODAS || — || align=right | 3.2 km || 
|-id=905 bgcolor=#fefefe
| 246905 ||  || — || March 20, 1998 || Socorro || LINEAR || — || align=right | 2.3 km || 
|-id=906 bgcolor=#d6d6d6
| 246906 ||  || — || April 17, 1998 || Kitt Peak || Spacewatch || — || align=right | 5.6 km || 
|-id=907 bgcolor=#E9E9E9
| 246907 ||  || — || May 23, 1998 || Kitt Peak || Spacewatch || — || align=right | 3.6 km || 
|-id=908 bgcolor=#d6d6d6
| 246908 ||  || — || June 16, 1998 || Kitt Peak || Spacewatch || — || align=right | 3.1 km || 
|-id=909 bgcolor=#E9E9E9
| 246909 ||  || — || August 22, 1998 || Xinglong || SCAP || — || align=right | 3.2 km || 
|-id=910 bgcolor=#E9E9E9
| 246910 ||  || — || August 24, 1998 || Caussols || ODAS || — || align=right | 1.6 km || 
|-id=911 bgcolor=#FA8072
| 246911 ||  || — || August 19, 1998 || Socorro || LINEAR || — || align=right | 2.7 km || 
|-id=912 bgcolor=#E9E9E9
| 246912 ||  || — || September 14, 1998 || Socorro || LINEAR || — || align=right | 1.7 km || 
|-id=913 bgcolor=#E9E9E9
| 246913 Slocum ||  ||  || September 23, 1998 || NRC-DAO || G. C. L. Aikman || — || align=right | 1.6 km || 
|-id=914 bgcolor=#fefefe
| 246914 ||  || — || September 26, 1998 || Socorro || LINEAR || — || align=right | 1.1 km || 
|-id=915 bgcolor=#E9E9E9
| 246915 ||  || — || October 22, 1998 || Caussols || ODAS || — || align=right | 1.3 km || 
|-id=916 bgcolor=#d6d6d6
| 246916 ||  || — || October 22, 1998 || Caussols || ODAS || — || align=right | 6.0 km || 
|-id=917 bgcolor=#E9E9E9
| 246917 ||  || — || October 25, 1998 || Oizumi || T. Kobayashi || — || align=right | 1.9 km || 
|-id=918 bgcolor=#d6d6d6
| 246918 ||  || — || October 18, 1998 || La Silla || E. W. Elst || — || align=right | 5.2 km || 
|-id=919 bgcolor=#E9E9E9
| 246919 ||  || — || October 28, 1998 || Socorro || LINEAR || — || align=right data-sort-value="0.99" | 990 m || 
|-id=920 bgcolor=#E9E9E9
| 246920 ||  || — || November 18, 1998 || Socorro || LINEAR || — || align=right | 3.6 km || 
|-id=921 bgcolor=#E9E9E9
| 246921 ||  || — || November 21, 1998 || Socorro || LINEAR || — || align=right | 2.5 km || 
|-id=922 bgcolor=#d6d6d6
| 246922 ||  || — || November 17, 1998 || Kitt Peak || Spacewatch || — || align=right | 4.9 km || 
|-id=923 bgcolor=#E9E9E9
| 246923 ||  || — || December 15, 1998 || Socorro || LINEAR || — || align=right | 1.8 km || 
|-id=924 bgcolor=#E9E9E9
| 246924 ||  || — || January 7, 1999 || Kitt Peak || Spacewatch || — || align=right | 1.7 km || 
|-id=925 bgcolor=#d6d6d6
| 246925 ||  || — || January 19, 1999 || Catalina || CSS || EUP || align=right | 4.9 km || 
|-id=926 bgcolor=#d6d6d6
| 246926 ||  || — || January 20, 1999 || Caussols || ODAS || — || align=right | 2.6 km || 
|-id=927 bgcolor=#d6d6d6
| 246927 ||  || — || January 19, 1999 || Kitt Peak || Spacewatch || THM || align=right | 2.8 km || 
|-id=928 bgcolor=#d6d6d6
| 246928 ||  || — || February 9, 1999 || Ondřejov || L. Kotková || — || align=right | 3.2 km || 
|-id=929 bgcolor=#E9E9E9
| 246929 ||  || — || February 6, 1999 || Mauna Kea || C. Veillet || PAD || align=right | 2.8 km || 
|-id=930 bgcolor=#d6d6d6
| 246930 ||  || — || March 14, 1999 || Kitt Peak || Spacewatch || VER || align=right | 4.4 km || 
|-id=931 bgcolor=#E9E9E9
| 246931 ||  || — || April 19, 1999 || Kitt Peak || Spacewatch || AST || align=right | 3.5 km || 
|-id=932 bgcolor=#fefefe
| 246932 ||  || — || May 10, 1999 || Socorro || LINEAR || — || align=right | 1.6 km || 
|-id=933 bgcolor=#fefefe
| 246933 ||  || — || June 11, 1999 || Socorro || LINEAR || PHO || align=right | 1.3 km || 
|-id=934 bgcolor=#E9E9E9
| 246934 || 1999 PL || — || August 6, 1999 || Monte Agliale || M. M. M. Santangelo || — || align=right | 5.3 km || 
|-id=935 bgcolor=#fefefe
| 246935 ||  || — || September 3, 1999 || Kitt Peak || Spacewatch || — || align=right | 2.3 km || 
|-id=936 bgcolor=#d6d6d6
| 246936 ||  || — || September 7, 1999 || Socorro || LINEAR || EUP || align=right | 6.6 km || 
|-id=937 bgcolor=#d6d6d6
| 246937 ||  || — || September 7, 1999 || Socorro || LINEAR || — || align=right | 2.7 km || 
|-id=938 bgcolor=#fefefe
| 246938 ||  || — || September 7, 1999 || Socorro || LINEAR || — || align=right | 1.6 km || 
|-id=939 bgcolor=#fefefe
| 246939 ||  || — || September 8, 1999 || Socorro || LINEAR || H || align=right | 1.3 km || 
|-id=940 bgcolor=#fefefe
| 246940 ||  || — || September 7, 1999 || Socorro || LINEAR || NYS || align=right | 1.1 km || 
|-id=941 bgcolor=#d6d6d6
| 246941 ||  || — || September 8, 1999 || Socorro || LINEAR || Tj (2.98) || align=right | 7.6 km || 
|-id=942 bgcolor=#fefefe
| 246942 ||  || — || September 8, 1999 || Socorro || LINEAR || — || align=right | 1.4 km || 
|-id=943 bgcolor=#fefefe
| 246943 ||  || — || September 8, 1999 || Socorro || LINEAR || V || align=right | 1.2 km || 
|-id=944 bgcolor=#E9E9E9
| 246944 ||  || — || September 8, 1999 || Socorro || LINEAR || — || align=right | 4.4 km || 
|-id=945 bgcolor=#d6d6d6
| 246945 ||  || — || September 9, 1999 || Socorro || LINEAR || — || align=right | 5.6 km || 
|-id=946 bgcolor=#d6d6d6
| 246946 ||  || — || September 9, 1999 || Socorro || LINEAR || THB || align=right | 5.0 km || 
|-id=947 bgcolor=#d6d6d6
| 246947 ||  || — || September 9, 1999 || Socorro || LINEAR || — || align=right | 3.2 km || 
|-id=948 bgcolor=#fefefe
| 246948 ||  || — || September 9, 1999 || Socorro || LINEAR || — || align=right | 1.1 km || 
|-id=949 bgcolor=#fefefe
| 246949 ||  || — || September 9, 1999 || Socorro || LINEAR || — || align=right | 1.2 km || 
|-id=950 bgcolor=#fefefe
| 246950 ||  || — || September 9, 1999 || Socorro || LINEAR || MAS || align=right | 1.1 km || 
|-id=951 bgcolor=#d6d6d6
| 246951 ||  || — || September 14, 1999 || Kitt Peak || Spacewatch || 7:4 || align=right | 7.0 km || 
|-id=952 bgcolor=#fefefe
| 246952 ||  || — || September 8, 1999 || Socorro || LINEAR || — || align=right | 1.6 km || 
|-id=953 bgcolor=#d6d6d6
| 246953 ||  || — || September 8, 1999 || Socorro || LINEAR || — || align=right | 4.9 km || 
|-id=954 bgcolor=#d6d6d6
| 246954 ||  || — || September 8, 1999 || Socorro || LINEAR || — || align=right | 5.0 km || 
|-id=955 bgcolor=#fefefe
| 246955 ||  || — || September 4, 1999 || Catalina || CSS || V || align=right | 1.2 km || 
|-id=956 bgcolor=#fefefe
| 246956 ||  || — || September 14, 1999 || Socorro || LINEAR || — || align=right | 1.2 km || 
|-id=957 bgcolor=#E9E9E9
| 246957 ||  || — || September 29, 1999 || Višnjan Observatory || K. Korlević || — || align=right | 3.9 km || 
|-id=958 bgcolor=#d6d6d6
| 246958 ||  || — || September 30, 1999 || Kitt Peak || Spacewatch || — || align=right | 5.1 km || 
|-id=959 bgcolor=#fefefe
| 246959 ||  || — || October 2, 1999 || Ondřejov || L. Kotková || — || align=right | 1.00 km || 
|-id=960 bgcolor=#d6d6d6
| 246960 ||  || — || October 7, 1999 || Goodricke-Pigott || R. A. Tucker || EOS || align=right | 3.9 km || 
|-id=961 bgcolor=#d6d6d6
| 246961 ||  || — || October 1, 1999 || Catalina || CSS || — || align=right | 6.0 km || 
|-id=962 bgcolor=#fefefe
| 246962 ||  || — || October 3, 1999 || Catalina || CSS || — || align=right | 2.9 km || 
|-id=963 bgcolor=#fefefe
| 246963 ||  || — || October 3, 1999 || Kitt Peak || Spacewatch || NYS || align=right data-sort-value="0.91" | 910 m || 
|-id=964 bgcolor=#E9E9E9
| 246964 ||  || — || October 7, 1999 || Kitt Peak || Spacewatch || MIT || align=right | 2.4 km || 
|-id=965 bgcolor=#d6d6d6
| 246965 ||  || — || October 9, 1999 || Kitt Peak || Spacewatch || 7:4 || align=right | 6.0 km || 
|-id=966 bgcolor=#fefefe
| 246966 ||  || — || October 11, 1999 || Kitt Peak || Spacewatch || MAS || align=right data-sort-value="0.85" | 850 m || 
|-id=967 bgcolor=#E9E9E9
| 246967 ||  || — || October 4, 1999 || Socorro || LINEAR || — || align=right | 4.8 km || 
|-id=968 bgcolor=#fefefe
| 246968 ||  || — || October 4, 1999 || Socorro || LINEAR || — || align=right | 1.3 km || 
|-id=969 bgcolor=#d6d6d6
| 246969 ||  || — || October 6, 1999 || Socorro || LINEAR || EOS || align=right | 3.2 km || 
|-id=970 bgcolor=#fefefe
| 246970 ||  || — || October 6, 1999 || Socorro || LINEAR || NYS || align=right | 1.0 km || 
|-id=971 bgcolor=#d6d6d6
| 246971 ||  || — || October 7, 1999 || Socorro || LINEAR || — || align=right | 4.3 km || 
|-id=972 bgcolor=#fefefe
| 246972 ||  || — || October 7, 1999 || Socorro || LINEAR || — || align=right | 1.3 km || 
|-id=973 bgcolor=#fefefe
| 246973 ||  || — || October 7, 1999 || Socorro || LINEAR || NYS || align=right data-sort-value="0.87" | 870 m || 
|-id=974 bgcolor=#fefefe
| 246974 ||  || — || October 7, 1999 || Socorro || LINEAR || NYS || align=right | 3.1 km || 
|-id=975 bgcolor=#fefefe
| 246975 ||  || — || October 10, 1999 || Socorro || LINEAR || — || align=right | 1.2 km || 
|-id=976 bgcolor=#fefefe
| 246976 ||  || — || October 12, 1999 || Socorro || LINEAR || — || align=right data-sort-value="0.98" | 980 m || 
|-id=977 bgcolor=#d6d6d6
| 246977 ||  || — || October 1, 1999 || Catalina || CSS || — || align=right | 5.3 km || 
|-id=978 bgcolor=#fefefe
| 246978 ||  || — || October 2, 1999 || Catalina || CSS || KLI || align=right | 2.7 km || 
|-id=979 bgcolor=#d6d6d6
| 246979 ||  || — || October 3, 1999 || Socorro || LINEAR || — || align=right | 4.3 km || 
|-id=980 bgcolor=#E9E9E9
| 246980 ||  || — || October 6, 1999 || Socorro || LINEAR || ADE || align=right | 4.1 km || 
|-id=981 bgcolor=#d6d6d6
| 246981 ||  || — || October 6, 1999 || Kitt Peak || Spacewatch || TIR || align=right | 2.3 km || 
|-id=982 bgcolor=#d6d6d6
| 246982 ||  || — || October 8, 1999 || Socorro || LINEAR || LIX || align=right | 6.4 km || 
|-id=983 bgcolor=#E9E9E9
| 246983 ||  || — || October 13, 1999 || Socorro || LINEAR || — || align=right | 2.6 km || 
|-id=984 bgcolor=#fefefe
| 246984 ||  || — || October 3, 1999 || Socorro || LINEAR || — || align=right | 1.4 km || 
|-id=985 bgcolor=#fefefe
| 246985 ||  || — || October 3, 1999 || Socorro || LINEAR || KLI || align=right | 2.3 km || 
|-id=986 bgcolor=#d6d6d6
| 246986 ||  || — || October 6, 1999 || Socorro || LINEAR || — || align=right | 5.2 km || 
|-id=987 bgcolor=#d6d6d6
| 246987 ||  || — || October 10, 1999 || Socorro || LINEAR || EUP || align=right | 7.8 km || 
|-id=988 bgcolor=#d6d6d6
| 246988 ||  || — || October 3, 1999 || Kitt Peak || Spacewatch || — || align=right | 3.9 km || 
|-id=989 bgcolor=#fefefe
| 246989 ||  || — || October 10, 1999 || Socorro || LINEAR || — || align=right | 1.5 km || 
|-id=990 bgcolor=#d6d6d6
| 246990 ||  || — || October 30, 1999 || Kitt Peak || Spacewatch || — || align=right | 4.2 km || 
|-id=991 bgcolor=#d6d6d6
| 246991 ||  || — || October 16, 1999 || Socorro || LINEAR || — || align=right | 5.1 km || 
|-id=992 bgcolor=#d6d6d6
| 246992 ||  || — || October 18, 1999 || Socorro || LINEAR || Tj (2.98) || align=right | 6.9 km || 
|-id=993 bgcolor=#fefefe
| 246993 ||  || — || October 31, 1999 || Catalina || CSS || — || align=right | 1.3 km || 
|-id=994 bgcolor=#fefefe
| 246994 ||  || — || October 20, 1999 || Socorro || LINEAR || — || align=right | 1.6 km || 
|-id=995 bgcolor=#fefefe
| 246995 ||  || — || October 29, 1999 || Anderson Mesa || LONEOS || — || align=right | 1.4 km || 
|-id=996 bgcolor=#d6d6d6
| 246996 ||  || — || October 31, 1999 || Socorro || LINEAR || EUP || align=right | 4.8 km || 
|-id=997 bgcolor=#d6d6d6
| 246997 ||  || — || November 8, 1999 || Višnjan || K. Korlević || LIX || align=right | 6.9 km || 
|-id=998 bgcolor=#E9E9E9
| 246998 ||  || — || November 2, 1999 || Kitt Peak || Spacewatch || — || align=right | 2.1 km || 
|-id=999 bgcolor=#d6d6d6
| 246999 ||  || — || November 4, 1999 || Kitt Peak || Spacewatch || — || align=right | 3.5 km || 
|-id=000 bgcolor=#fefefe
| 247000 ||  || — || November 3, 1999 || Catalina || CSS || NYS || align=right | 1.0 km || 
|}

References

External links 
 Discovery Circumstances: Numbered Minor Planets (245001)–(250000) (IAU Minor Planet Center)

0246